= National Register of Historic Places listings in Portland, Maine =

Map of Portland within Cumberland County

This is a list of the National Register of Historic Places listings in Portland, Maine. This is intended to be a complete list of the properties and districts on the National Register. Latitude and longitude coordinates are provided for many National Register properties and districts; these locations may be seen together in an online map.

There are 250 properties and districts listed on the National Register in Cumberland County, including 11 National Historic Landmarks. 150 of these properties and districts, including 4 National Historic Landmarks, are located outside of Portland, and are listed separately, while the 100 properties and districts in Portland are listed here. Two properties in Portland were once listed but have been removed.

Contents: Counties and municipalities in Maine
Androscoggin - Aroostook - Cumberland (City of Portland) - Franklin - Hancock - Kennebec - Knox - Lincoln - Oxford - Penobscot - Piscataquis - Sagadahoc - Somerset - Waldo - Washington - York

This National Park Service list is complete through NPS recent listings posted May 22, 2026.

== Current listings ==
	Name on the Register	Image	Date listed	Location	Description
1	Abyssinian Meeting House	Abyssinian Meeting House	February 3, 2006 (#05001612)	73-75 Newbury St. 43°39′44″N 70°14′58″W	
2	Back Cove	Back Cove	October 16, 1989 (#89001706)	Roughly Baxter Boulevard along Back Cove from Baxter to Veranda Sts. 43°40′25″N 70°16′15″W	
3	Bagheera	Bagheera	November 4, 2009 (#09000878)	Maine State Pier, Commercial St. 43°39′24″N 70°14′52″W	
4	Battery Steele	Battery Steele	October 20, 2005 (#05001176)	Florida Ave. on Peaks Island; 43°39′32″N 70°10′50″W	
5	Harrison B. Brown House	Harrison B. Brown House	June 23, 1980 (#80000227)	400 Danforth St. 43°38′39″N 70°16′19″W	
6	J.B. Brown Memorial Block	J.B. Brown Memorial Block	May 23, 1978 (#78000167)	Congress and Casco Sts. 43°39′21″N 70°15′42″W	
7	A.B. Butler House	A.B. Butler House	May 8, 1974 (#74000158)	4 Walker St. 43°39′09″N 70°16′10″W	
8	Cathedral of the Immaculate Conception	Cathedral of the Immaculate Conception	June 20, 1985 (#85001257)	307 Congress St; 43°39′41″N 70°15′17″W	
9	Leonard Bond Chapman House	Leonard Bond Chapman House	April 23, 1980 (#80000228)	90 Capisic St. 43°39′43″N 70°18′10″W	
10	Chestnut Street Methodist Church	Chestnut Street Methodist Church	October 20, 1977 (#77000063)	11-19 Chestnut St. 43°39′34″N 70°15′30″W	
11	Children's Hospital	Children's Hospital	March 7, 2012 (#12000065)	68 High St. 43°39′08″N 70°15′38″W	
12	Charles Q. Clapp Block	Charles Q. Clapp Block	January 31, 1978 (#78000168)	Congress Sq. 43°39′15″N 70°15′47″W	
13	Charles Q. Clapp House	Charles Q. Clapp House	February 23, 1972 (#72000072)	97 Spring St. 43°39′13″N 70°15′43″W	
14	Nathan Clifford School	Nathan Clifford School	December 18, 2013 (#13000925)	180 Falmouth St. 43°39′37″N 70°16′49″W	
15	Deering Estate Barn	Deering Estate Barn	August 13, 1969 (#09000089)	Falmouth St. on the University of Southern Maine campus 43°39′49″N 70°16′40″W	Demolished 1969.
16	Deering Oaks	Deering Oaks	October 16, 1989 (#89001708)	Roughly bounded by Interstate 295, Forest St., Park Ave., and Deering Ave. 43°39′32″N 70°16′20″W	
17	Deering Street Historic District	Deering Street Historic District	January 27, 1983 (#83000448)	Congress, Deering, Mellen, and State Sts. 43°39′17″N 70°16′07″W	
18	Gen. Neal Dow House	Gen. Neal Dow House	April 11, 1973 (#73000236)	714 Congress St. 43°39′11″N 70°16′12″W	
19	Nathaniel Dyer House	Nathaniel Dyer House	April 15, 1987 (#86003534)	168 York St. 43°38′58″N 70°15′34″W	
20	Eastern Cemetery	Eastern Cemetery	December 12, 1973 (#73000112)	Congress St. at its junction with Mountfort St. 43°39′46″N 70°15′03″W	
21	Eastern Promenade	Eastern Promenade	October 16, 1989 (#89001707)	Roughly bounded by Eastern Promenade and Casco Bay; 43°40′20″N 70°14′50″W	
22	Eighth Maine Regiment Memorial	Eighth Maine Regiment Memorial	October 4, 2006 (#06000919)	13 8th Main Ave., Peaks Island; 43°39′09″N 70°11′32″W	
23	Engine Company Number Nine Firehouse	Engine Company Number Nine Firehouse	October 28, 2010 (#10000876)	17 Arbor St. 43°41′08″N 70°17′34″W	
24	Everett Chambers	Everett Chambers	May 19, 2006 (#06000397)	47-55 Oak St. 43°39′18″N 70°15′42″W	
25	Evergreen Cemetery	Evergreen Cemetery	June 18, 1992 (#92000791)	Off the western side of Stevens Ave., north of its junction with Brighton Ave. 43°40′51″N 70°18′04″W	
26	Fifth Maine Regiment Community Center	Fifth Maine Regiment Community Center	January 5, 1978 (#78000169)	Seashore Ave. on Peaks Island; 43°39′10″N 70°11′36″W	
27	First Parish Church	First Parish Church	January 12, 1973 (#73000113)	425 Congress St. 43°39′30″N 70°15′32″W	
28	Fort Gorges	Fort Gorges	August 28, 1973 (#73000114)	East of Portland on Hog Island in Portland Harbor; 43°39′46″N 70°13′18″W	
29	Fort McKinley Historic District	Fort McKinley Historic District	March 21, 1985 (#85000611)	Great Diamond Island; 43°41′00″N 70°11′47″W	
30	Fort McKinley Torpedo Storehouse		March 19, 2024 (#100010087)	148 Coveside Drive, Great Diamond Island; 43°41′00″N 70°11′23″W	
31	Franklin Towers	Franklin Towers	March 5, 2024 (#100009363)	211 Cumberland Ave. (Tax ID address 61 Wilmot St.); 43°39′41″N 70°15′22″W	
32	The Gothic House	The Gothic House	December 31, 1974 (#72001539)	387 Spring St. 43°38′45″N 70°16′30″W	
33	Green Memorial A.M.E. Zion Church	Green Memorial A.M.E. Zion Church	January 17, 1973 (#73000115)	46 Sheridan St. 43°39′50″N 70°14′58″W	
34	Byron Greenough Block	Byron Greenough Block	March 10, 1977 (#77000065)	Free and Middle Sts. 43°39′25″N 70°15′28″W	
35	Greenwood Garden Playhouse		September 10, 2021 (#100006989)	32 Garden Pl., Peaks Island; 43°39′13″N 70°11′54″W	
36	Griffin House	Griffin House	July 19, 1984 (#84001360)	200 High St. 43°39′21″N 70°15′59″W	
37	Hamblen Block	Hamblen Block	July 21, 1983 (#83000449)	188-194 Danforth St. 43°38′54″N 70°15′50″W	
38	Hamblen Development Historic District	Hamblen Development Historic District	June 18, 1992 (#92000802)	188-208 Danforth St. 43°38′54″N 70°15′50″W	
39	Asa Hanson Block	Asa Hanson Block	December 31, 2001 (#01001418)	548-550 Congress St. 43°39′19″N 70°15′43″W	
40	How Houses	How Houses	January 20, 1980 (#80000377)	23 Danforth St., 30-32, 40 Pleasant Sts. 43°39′14″N 70°15′30″W	A small group of houses belonging to the How family
41	Daniel How House	Daniel How House	April 24, 1973 (#73000265)	23 Danforth St. 43°39′14″N 70°15′30″W	
42	Joseph Holt Ingraham House	Joseph Holt Ingraham House	July 16, 1973 (#73000116)	51 State St. 43°39′00″N 70°15′41″W	
43	Lancaster Block	Lancaster Block	September 29, 1982 (#82000745)	474 Congress St. 43°39′25″N 70°15′35″W	
44	Adam P. Leighton House	Adam P. Leighton House	September 29, 1982 (#82000746)	261 Western Promenade; 43°39′04″N 70°16′34″W	
45	Lincoln Park	Lincoln Park	October 16, 1989 (#89001709)	Bounded by Pearl, Franklin, Market, and Federal Sts. 43°39′35″N 70°15′18″W	
46	Little Diamond Island Casino		June 4, 2026 (#100013104)	0 Fessenden Avenue, Little Diamond Island; 43°39′49″N 70°12′37″W	
47	Henry Wadsworth Longfellow Monument	Henry Wadsworth Longfellow Monument	April 5, 1990 (#90000580)	Southeastern corner of State and Congress Sts. 43°39′11″N 70°16′02″W	
48	Maine Archeological Site No. 9-16		May 7, 1979 (#79000141)	Great Diamond Island	Native American site
49	Maine Central Railroad General Office Building	Maine Central Railroad General Office Building	January 7, 1988 (#87002192)	222-224 St. John St. 43°39′03″N 70°16′48″W	
50	Maine Eye and Ear Infirmary	Maine Eye and Ear Infirmary	September 25, 1986 (#86002469)	794-800 Congress St. 43°39′13″N 70°16′24″W	
51	Maine Historical Society	Maine Historical Society	November 17, 1980 (#80000230)	485 Congress St. 43°39′25″N 70°15′38″W	The Society's 1907 Library Building, located next to the Wadsworth-Longfellow House.
52	Maine Publicity Bureau Building	Maine Publicity Bureau Building	January 26, 1990 (#89002344)	501 Danforth St. 43°38′38″N 70°16′34″W	
53	Marine Hospital	Marine Hospital	August 21, 1974 (#74000161)	331 Veranda St. 43°41′18″N 70°14′51″W	
54	Mariner's Church	Mariner's Church	April 23, 1973 (#73000117)	368-374 Fore St. 43°39′23″N 70°15′11″W	
55	Masonic Temple	Masonic Temple	February 11, 1982 (#82000748)	415 Congress St. 43°39′32″N 70°15′30″W	
56	McLellan-Sweat Mansion	McLellan-Sweat Mansion	March 5, 1970 (#70000073)	111 High St. 43°39′12″N 70°15′45″W	
57	Mechanics' Hall	Mechanics' Hall	October 3, 1973 (#73000118)	519 Congress St. 43°39′23″N 70°15′43″W	
58	William Minott House	William Minott House	July 10, 1979 (#79000142)	45 Park St. 43°39′03″N 70°15′38″W	
59	Morse-Libby Mansion	Morse-Libby Mansion	May 19, 1970 (#70000074)	109 Danforth St. 43°39′06″N 70°15′40″W	
60	North School	North School	April 12, 1982 (#82000749)	248-264 Congress Street; 43°39′44″N 70°15′07″W	
61	Park Street Row	Park Street Row	February 23, 1972 (#72000074)	88-114 Park St. 43°39′06″N 70°15′46″W	
62	Porteous, Mitchell and Braun Company Building	Porteous, Mitchell and Braun Company Building	September 27, 1996 (#96001039)	522-528 Congress St. 43°39′21″N 70°15′40″W	
63	Portland City Hall	Portland City Hall	May 7, 1973 (#73000119)	389 Congress St. 43°39′34″N 70°15′27″W	
64	Portland City Hospital	Portland City Hospital	March 21, 1985 (#85000612)	Brighton Ave. 43°40′37″N 70°19′31″W	
65	Portland Club	Portland Club	January 25, 1973 (#73000120)	156 State St. 43°39′07″N 70°15′58″W	
66	Portland High School	Portland High School	November 23, 1984 (#84003879)	284 Cumberland Ave. 43°39′33″N 70°15′34″W	
67	Portland Observatory	Portland Observatory	April 24, 1973 (#73000122)	138 Congress St. 43°39′56″N 70°14′11″W	
68	Portland Packing Company Factory	Portland Packing Company Factory	June 7, 1996 (#96000651)	14-26 York St. 43°39′14″N 70°15′27″W	
69	Portland Soldiers and Sailors Monument	Portland Soldiers and Sailors Monument	April 1, 1998 (#98000308)	Junction of Congress St. and Federal St. 43°39′26″N 70°15′34″W	
70	Portland Waterfront Historic District	Portland Waterfront Historic District	May 2, 1974 (#74000353)	Waterfront area; also 79-85 and 295-309 Commercial and 3 Center Sts.; also Merrill's Wharf, 252-260 Commercial St.; also 113-115 Middle St. 43°39′17″N 70°15′37″W	Addresses on Commercial and Center Sts. represent boundary increases of December 23, 1984 and March 7, 2012; addresses on Middle Street represent a boundary increase approved October 5, 2020.
71	Rackleff Building	Rackleff Building	May 9, 1973 (#73000123)	129–131 Middle St. 43°39′31″N 70°15′14″W	
72	Thomas Brackett Reed House	Thomas Brackett Reed House	May 7, 1973 (#73000239)	30-32 Deering St. 43°39′15″N 70°16′03″W	Home of Thomas Brackett Reed, nineteenth-century Speaker of the United States House of Representatives
73	Thomas B. Reed School	Thomas B. Reed School	January 6, 2020 (#100004827)	26 Homestead Ave. 43°41′42″N 70°18′06″W	
74	John B. Russwurm House	John B. Russwurm House	July 21, 1983 (#83000450)	238 Ocean Ave. 43°40′44″N 70°16′49″W	Home of John B. Russwurm, abolitionist
75	Sagamore Village Historic District	Sagamore Village Historic District	August 3, 2020 (#100005397)	Cabot, Purchase, Popham, Godfrey, and Josselyn Sts., and portions of Taft and Brighton Aves. 43°40′35″N 70°19′19″W	
76	St. Joseph's Academy and Convent	St. Joseph's Academy and Convent	March 27, 2017 (#100000806)	605 Stevens Ave.; also 631 Stevens Ave. 43°40′44″N 70°17′39″W	631 Stevens Ave. represents a boundary increase approved December 30, 2022.
77	St. Lawrence Church	St. Lawrence Church	October 1, 1979 (#79000145)	76 Congress St. 43°40′01″N 70°14′48″W	Church demolished; parish hall converted to a performing arts center.
78	St. Paul's Church and Rectory	St. Paul's Church and Rectory	December 22, 1978 (#78000176)	279 Congress St. 43°39′43″N 70°15′12″W	
79	Schlotterbeck and Foss Building	Schlotterbeck and Foss Building	July 11, 2016 (#16000436)	117 Preble St. 43°39′37″N 70°15′48″W	
80	F.O.J. Smith Tomb	F.O.J. Smith Tomb	December 31, 1974 (#74000166)	Evergreen Cemetery; 43°40′47″N 70°18′08″W	
81	Sparrow House	Sparrow House	October 29, 1982 (#82000421)	35 Arlington St. 43°40′12″N 70°16′58″W	
82	Spring Street Historic District	Spring Street Historic District	April 3, 1970 (#70000043)	Roughly bounded by Forest, Oak, Danforth, Brackett and Pine Sts. 43°39′08″N 70°15′50″W	
83	John Calvin Stevens House	John Calvin Stevens House	July 16, 1973 (#73000125)	52 Bowdoin St. 43°38′48″N 70°16′30″W	
84	Stroudwater Historic District	Stroudwater Historic District	February 16, 1973 (#73000126)	Residential area at the confluence of the Stroudwater and Fore Rivers; 43°39′24″N 70°18′52″W	
85	Tate House	Tate House	January 12, 1970 (#70000072)	1270 Westbrook St. 43°39′25″N 70°18′43″W	
86	Thompson Block	Thompson Block	February 28, 1973 (#73000127)	117, 119, 121, 123, and 125 Middle St. 43°39′32″N 70°15′11″W	
87	Timberwind (Schooner)	Timberwind (Schooner)	March 26, 1992 (#92000274)	Maine State Pier, Commercial St.	Moved from Rockport to Belfast in 2015 and to Portland in 2018.
88	Tracy-Causer Block	Tracy-Causer Block	March 17, 1994 (#89001941)	505-509 Fore St. 43°39′18″N 70°15′26″W	
89	Trefethen-Evergreen Improvement Association		March 19, 2024 (#100010086)	12 Trefethen Avenue, Peaks Island; 43°40′09″N 70°11′31″W	
90	U.S. Courthouse	U.S. Courthouse	February 12, 1974 (#74000168)	156 Federal St. 43°39′31″N 70°15′42″W	
91	U.S. Customhouse	U.S. Customhouse	May 17, 1973 (#73000128)	312 Fore St. 43°39′26″N 70°15′05″W	
92	US Post Office-Portland Main	US Post Office-Portland Main	May 9, 1986 (#86001011)	125 Forest Avenue; 43°39′30″N 70°16′00″W	
93	Wadsworth-Longfellow House	Wadsworth-Longfellow House	October 15, 1966 (#66000090)	487 Congress St. 43°39′23″N 70°15′40″W	
94	Wendameen (Yacht)	Wendameen (Yacht)	March 26, 1992 (#92000273)	Maine State Pier, Commercial St. 43°39′26″N 70°14′55″W	Although listed in Camden, she is now based in Portland.
95	Westbrook College Historic District	Westbrook College Historic District	September 15, 1977 (#77000066)	716 Stevens Ave. 43°41′00″N 70°17′45″W	
96	Western Cemetery	Western Cemetery	March 17, 2025 (#100011543)	6 Vaughan Street; 43°38′44″N 70°16′26″W	
97	Western Promenade	Western Promenade	October 16, 1989 (#89001710)	Roughly Western Promenade from Maine Medical Center to Valley St. 43°38′48″N 70°16′32″W	
98	Western Promenade Historic District	Western Promenade Historic District	February 16, 1984 (#84001363)	Roughly bounded by Western Promenade and Bramhall, Brackett, Emery, and Danforth Sts. 43°38′54″N 70°16′19″W	
99	Williston-West Church and Parish House	Williston-West Church and Parish House	June 22, 1980 (#80000232)	32 Thomas St. 43°38′52″N 70°16′16″W	
100	Woodman Building	Woodman Building	February 23, 1972 (#72000075)	133-141 Middle St. 43°39′31″N 70°15′15″W	

== Former listings ==
	Name on the Register	Image	Date listed	Date removed	Location	Description
1	First Baptist Church		January 31, 1978 (#78000170)	July 14, 2015	353 Congress St. 43°39′37″N 70°15′20″W	
2	Portland Stove Foundry		November 18, 1974 (#74000164)	January 22, 2009	57 Kennebec St. 43°39′44″N 70°15′40″W	Significantly damaged by fires in 1989 and 1991. Subsequently demolished.

== See also ==
- List of National Historic Landmarks in Maine
- National Register of Historic Places listings in Maine
