= Eighth Maine Regiment Memorial =

- U.S. National Register of Historic Places
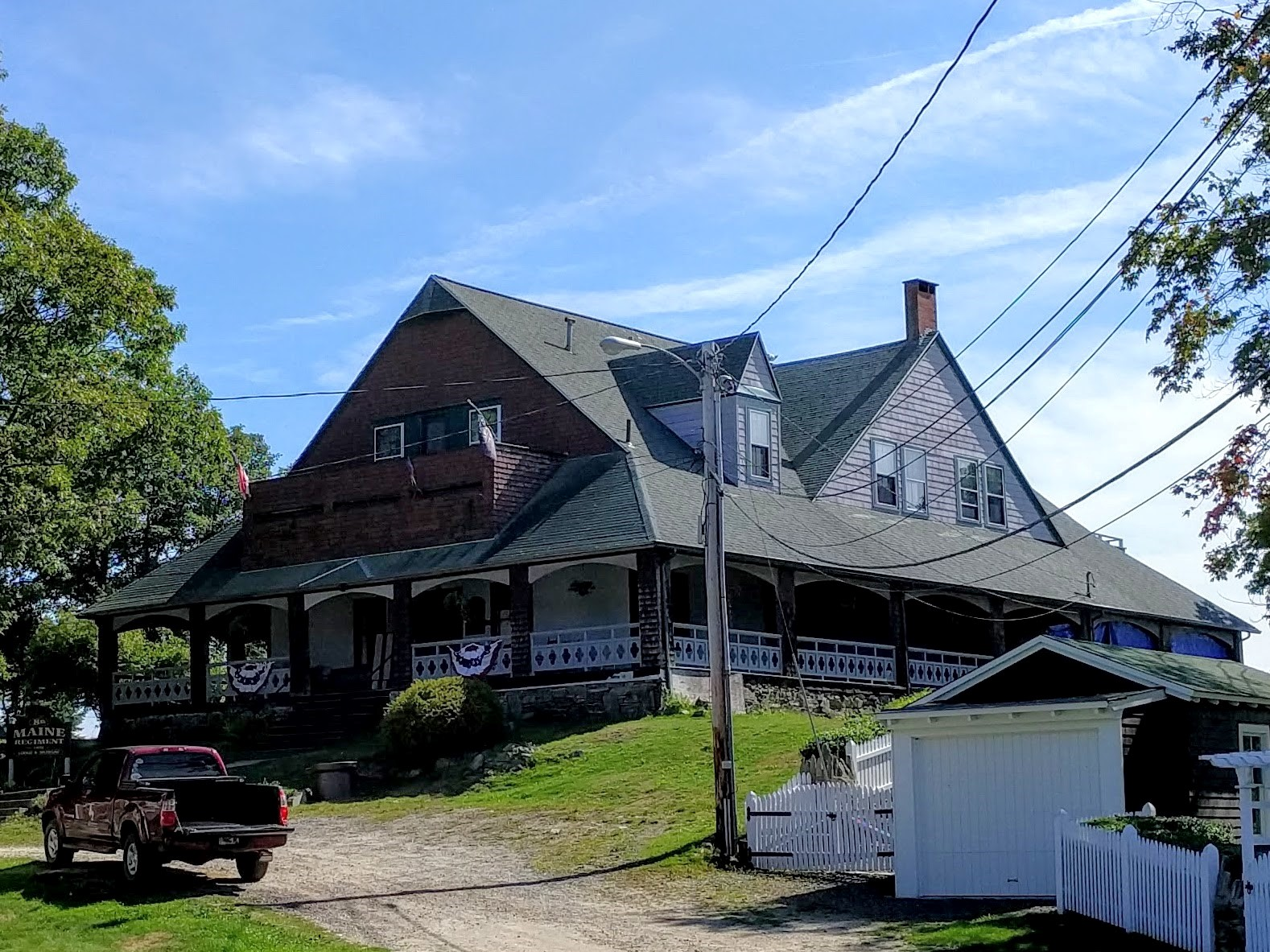

- Location within Maine Location within the United States
- Location: 13 Eighth Main Ave., Peaks Island, Portland, Maine
- Coordinates: 43°39′9″N 70°11′32″W
- Area: 0.6 acres (0.24 ha)
- Built: 1891
- Architect: Francis Fasset & Frederick Tompson
- Architectural style: Shingle Style
- NRHP reference No.: 06000919
- Added to NRHP: October 4, 2006

The Eighth Maine Regiment Memorial, now the 8th Maine Lodge, is a historic summer fraternal meeting house at 13 Eighth Maine Avenue on Peaks Island, an island neighborhood of Portland, Maine. Built in 1891 as a reunion site for veterans of the American Civil War 8th Maine Volunteer Infantry Regiment, it is a fine example of Shingle style architecture, and an important work of the local architectural firm of Fasset and Tompson. It was listed on the National Register of Historic Places in 2006, and presently operates as a summer lodge and museum, with rooms rented to the public.

== Description and history ==
The Eighth Maine Memorial is located on the south coast of Peaks Island, a large island at the southeastern edge of Casco Bay east of downtown Portland. It is a large two-story rectangular structure, with a gabled roof whose sides are punctuated by large cross gables. The main roof extends down to the first floor, where it transitions into the roof of a porch that wraps around the entire structure. The walls are finished in a combination of clapboards, wooden and vinyl shingles, and asphalt shingles. The building rests on a fieldstone foundation that slopes down toward the shore, exposing part of the basement. At one corner an octagonal three-story tower rises. The building interior is organized with public spaces on the ground floor, kitchen and service facilities in the basement, and living quarters on the second floor.

The memorial was erected in 1891 for the use of the 8th Maine Regiment Association, a fraternal society of American Civil War veterans who had served in the 8th Maine Volunteer Infantry Regiment. Its construction was funded in large part by Colonel William M. McArthur, who won $70,000 in a lottery run by Confederate Army General P.G.T. Beauregard to raise funds for the reconstruction of Louisiana after the war. The building was designed by the Portland firm of Fasset and Tompson, a prolific team who had also designed the nearby Fifth Maine Regiment Hall. The hall was used for annual reunions until 1936, the last year one of the original veterans attended. The building continues to be owned by the association, and continues to be used by the descendants of the 8th's members. Rooms are rented to the public on a space-available basis.

== See also ==
- National Register of Historic Places listings in Portland, Maine
