= Tracy-Causer Block =

- U.S. National Register of Historic Places
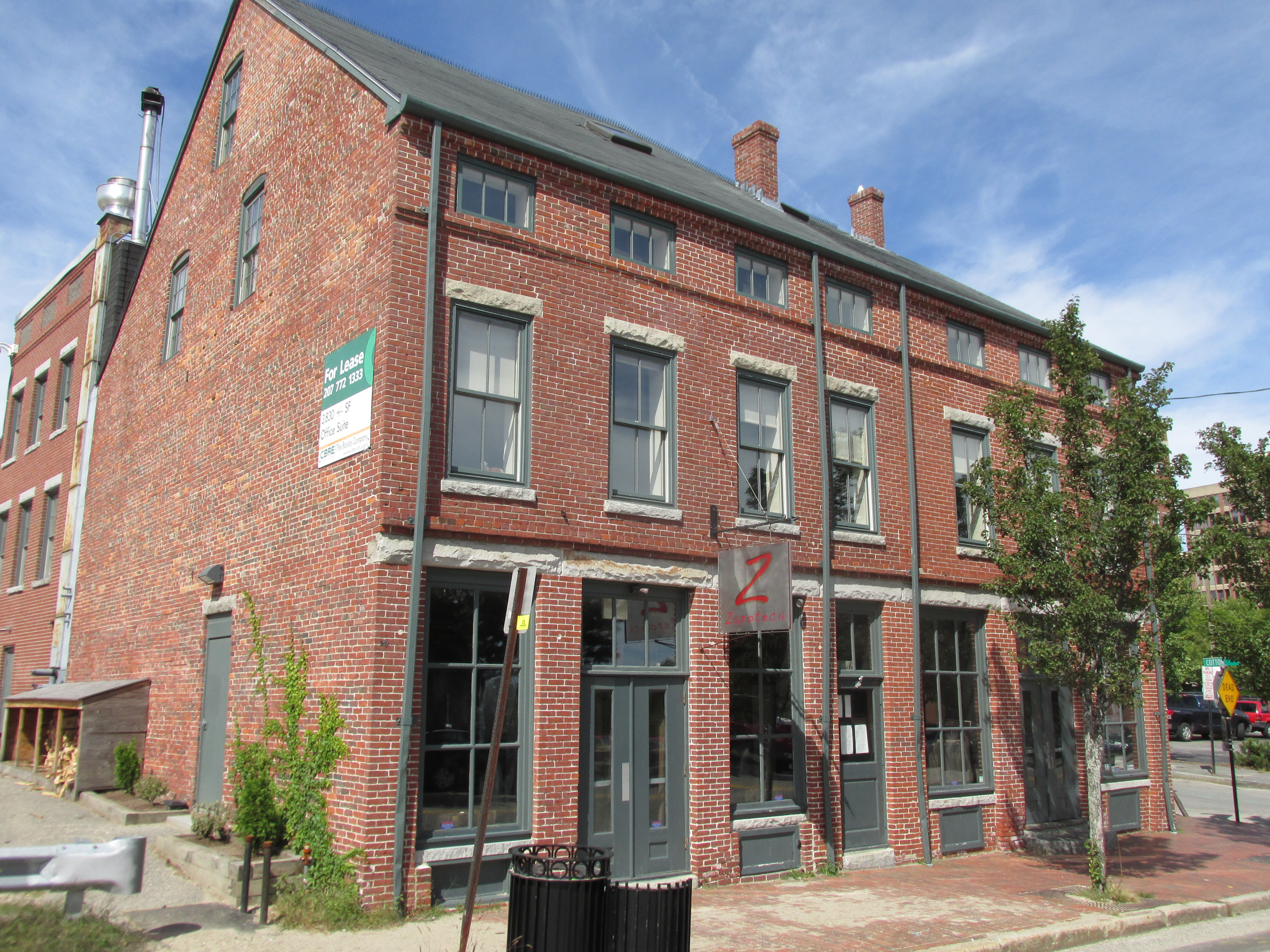
- Tracy-Causer Block

- Location within Maine Location within the United States
- Location: 505-509 Fore Street, Portland, Maine
- Coordinates: 43°39′18″N 70°15′26″W
- Built: 1866
- Architectural style: Greek Revival
- NRHP reference No.: 89001941
- Added to NRHP: March 17, 1994

The Tracy-Causer Block is a historic commercial building located at 505–509 Fore Street in the Old Port commercial district of Portland, Maine. Built in 1866 as a mixed-used residential and commercial building, it is a rare surviving example of this type of building in the city. It was listed on the National Register of Historic Places in 1994.

== Description and history ==
The Tracy-Causer Block is located at the northwest corner of Fore and Cotton Streets, an area known as Gorham's Corner, a historic intersection. It is a 2-1/2 story brick building, with a gabled roof and modest stylistic details. A beltcourse of rusticated stone separates the first and second floors on the south-facing front, with similar stone used for the window sills and lintels on the second floor. A beltcourse of projecting brick separates the second floor from a series of three-pane transom-style windows, which are set just below the cornice. Windows on the upper levels of the west side are set in segmented-arch openings. The ground floor main facade is organized into two storefronts, each with entrances separated by flanking display windows by brick piers, and a central entrance to the building's upper floors.

The city of Portland was devastated by a major fire on July 4, 1866. This building was constructed in the wake of that fire by John Tracy and William Causer. It was built in the style of older commercial buildings, where the merchants typically lived above the store. This style was not emulated in much of the rebuilding that took place after the fire, with most commercial spaces dedicated exclusively to business use. This building is thus a rare example of a building that was more typical before the fire than after it.

== See also ==
- National Register of Historic Places listings in Portland, Maine
