= Park Street Row =

Historic houses in Maine, United States

- U.S. National Register of Historic Places
- U.S. Historic district – Contributing property
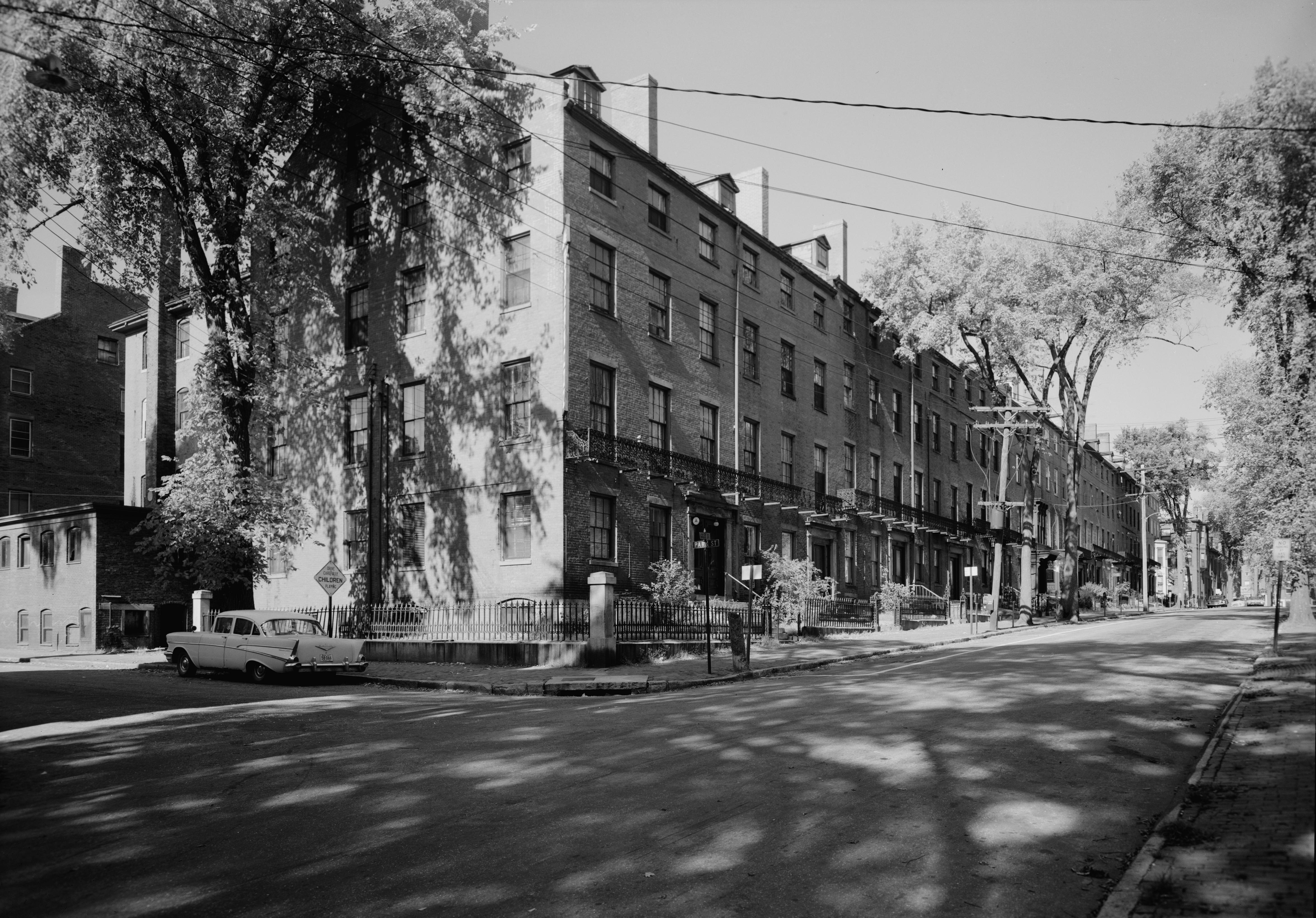
- View of the front

- Location within Maine Location within the United States
- Location: 88-114 Park Street, Portland, Maine
- Coordinates: 43°39′6″N 70°15′46″W
- Area: 1.9 acres (0.77 ha)
- Built: 1835
- Architectural style: Greek revival
- Part of: Spring Street Historic District (ID70000043)
- NRHP reference No.: 72000074

Significant dates
- Added to NRHP: February 23, 1972
- Designated CP: April 3, 1970

The Park Street Row, also known as Park Street Block, is a set of historic rowhouses at 88–114 Park Street in Portland, Maine. Built in 1835, it is the largest known 19th-century rowhouse in the state, and is a local example of Greek Revival architecture. It was added to the National Register of Historic Places in 1972.

== Description and history ==
The Park Street Row is located in the eastern section of Portland's West End neighborhood, occupying the entire west side of Park Street between Spring and Gray Streets. It consists of fourteen residential units, built out of brick with brownstone trim, and resting on granite foundations. Each unit is four stories tall, with a dormered and skylit roof. The fronts of the units are three bays wide, with entrances in the right-hand bay. Iron railings are set on granite curbing between the stairs leading to each unit, and shallow iron balconies run the width of each unit. Due to the street's slope, the units are stepped in pairs.

This housing project was one of the most ambitious of its type undertaken in 19th-century Maine. The rowhouse concept was introduced to Portland by John Neal, a writer and critic who was also an architect. In 1835, he made plans to build a row of eight connected homes on nearby State Street, but reduced the project to only two units after his investors backed out and formed the Ann Street Company (Park Street was previously Ann Street). That same year the company purchased a ropewalk extending nearly to Congress Street, and began construction on these rowhouses. These fourteen units were completed, as were six more that faced Gray and Spring Streets; the three on Spring Street also survive. Due to the Panic of 1837, the company was only able to complete the building exteriors, and they were auctioned off, unfinished, between October 1835 and 1838. The individual unit interiors were then completed by their purchasers. Some were used initially to store hay and other materials. Looking back on this development three decades later, Neal described Park Street Row as "a huge, unsafe, unsightly row of tall houses, which passed then, and still pass for a factory, with strangers". It was added to the National Register of Historic Places in 1972.

== See also ==
- National Register of Historic Places listings in Portland, Maine
