= Leonard Bond Chapman House =

Historic house in Maine, United States

- U.S. National Register of Historic Places
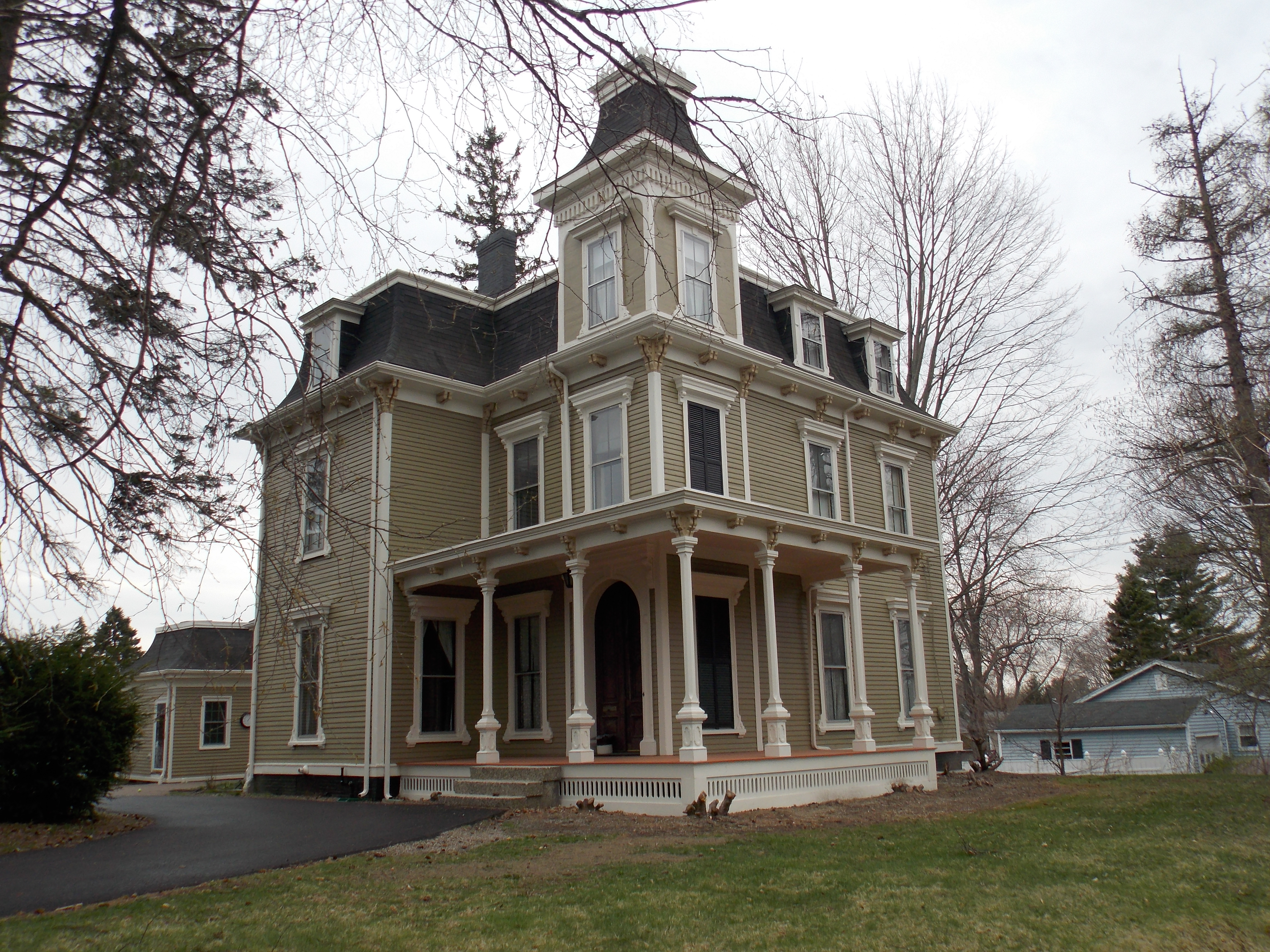

- Location within Maine Location within the United States
- Location: 90 Capisic Street; Portland, Maine
- Coordinates: 43°39′43″N 70°18′10″W
- Area: 0.6 acres (0.24 ha)
- Built: 1866
- Architectural style: Italianate, Mansard
- NRHP reference No.: 80000228
- Added to NRHP: April 23, 1980

The Leonard Bond Chapman House is an historic house at 90 Capisic Street in Portland, Maine. Built between 1866 and 1868, it is a fine and distinctive local example of Second Empire architecture, and is notable as the home of one Portland's leading historians of the period, Leonard Bond Chapman. The house was listed on the National Register of Historic Places in 1980.

== Description and history ==
The Chapman House is located in Portland's western Rosemont neighborhood, on the south side of Capisic Street, between Bancroft and Frost Streets. It is a 2 1/2-story wood-frame structure, with a mansard roof providing a full third floor. At the northeast corner of the house is an inset three-story square tower, topped by a mansard roof that has an unusually small center and widely flaring eaves. The main cornice is studded with paired brackets in the Italianate style, and a porch wraps around the front and side of the corner with the tower. The porch roof is supported by carved round posts, and also features brackets. To the rear of the property stands a period carriage house with similar styling.

The house was built between 1866 and 1868, and represents a locally unusual example of the Second Empire mansard-roofed style. It was built for Leonard Bond Chapman, a Portland native who was professionally a nursery owner. His avocation, however, was as an antiquarian and collector of manuscripts, particularly on the subject of Portland history. He was a longtime active member of the Maine Historical Society, for which he wrote numerous treatises on all aspects of the city's history.

== See also ==
- National Register of Historic Places listings in Portland, Maine
