= Hamblen Development Historic District =

Historic district in Maine, United States

- U.S. National Register of Historic Places
- U.S. Historic district
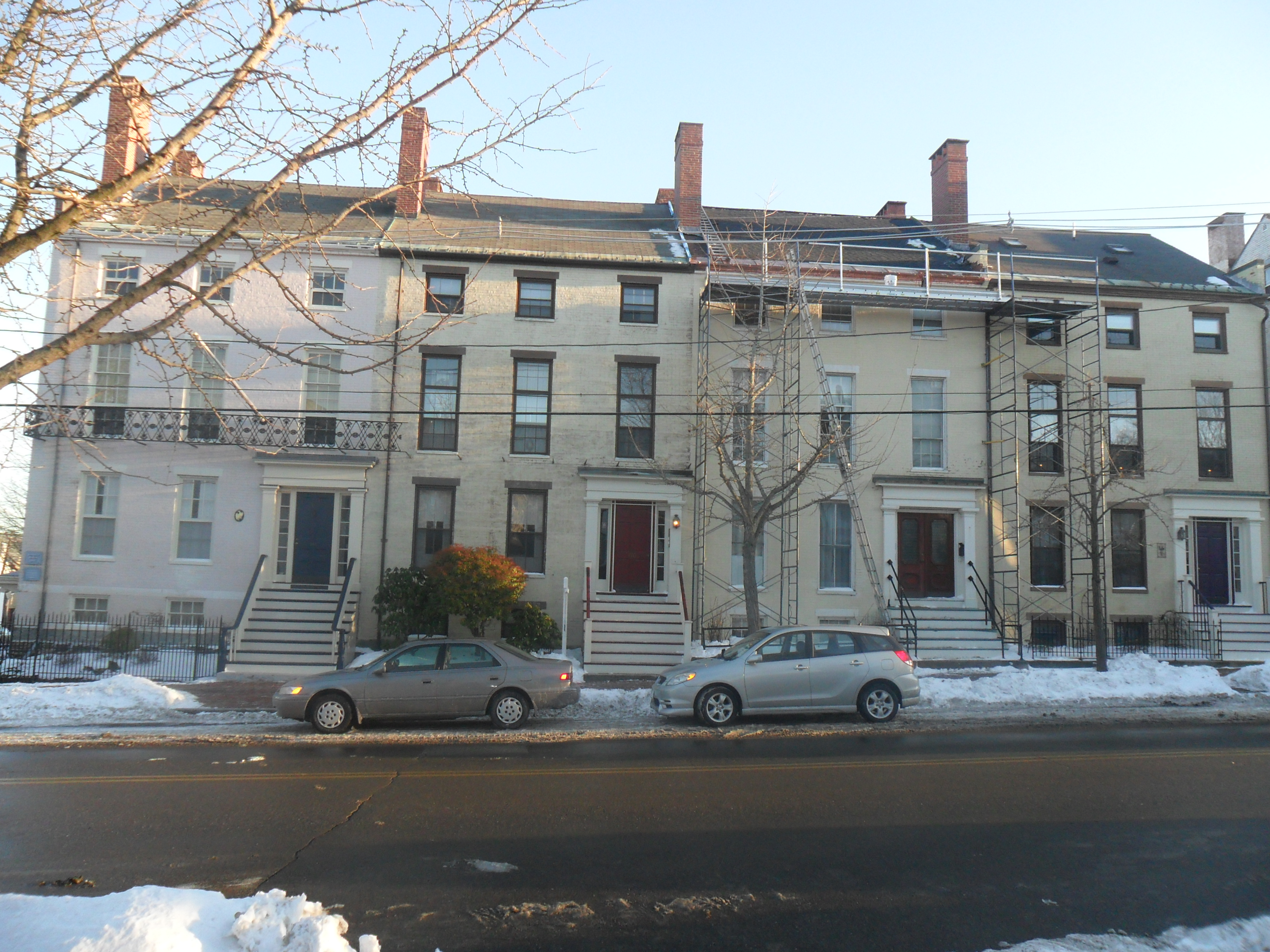
- The Hamblen Block rowhouses

- Location within Maine Location within the United States
- Location: 188-208 Danforth St., Portland, Maine
- Coordinates: 43°38′54″N 70°15′50″W
- Area: 1.5 acres (0.61 ha)
- Built: 1835
- Architectural style: Greek Revival
- NRHP reference No.: 92000802
- Added to NRHP: June 18, 1992

The Hamblen Development Historic District encompasses a modest collection of Greek Revival residential properties at 188–208 Danforth Street in Portland, Maine. They were built in 1835–36 as a speculative venture by members of the Hamblen family, and are a rare surviving cluster of development in the city from this period. The district was listed on the National Register of Historic Places in 1992.

== Description and history ==
The Hamblen Development occupies the south side of one block of Danforth Street, on the east side of Portland's West End, between Brackett and Clark Streets. The eastern half of the block is occupied by the Hamblen Block (188–194), a series of four three-story brick rowhouses built in 1835. To its west stands a brick duplex (196–198), also three stories in brick, set in a mirror-image layout, that was built in 1836. Also built in 1836 was 200 Danforth, a free-standing single family house that is three bays wide, like the duplex and rowhouse units are. At the end of the block stands another duplex (206–208); this building has a more elaborate roof treatment, with a modillioned cornice, and the left-hand unit has a few rare surviving period wrought iron grills.

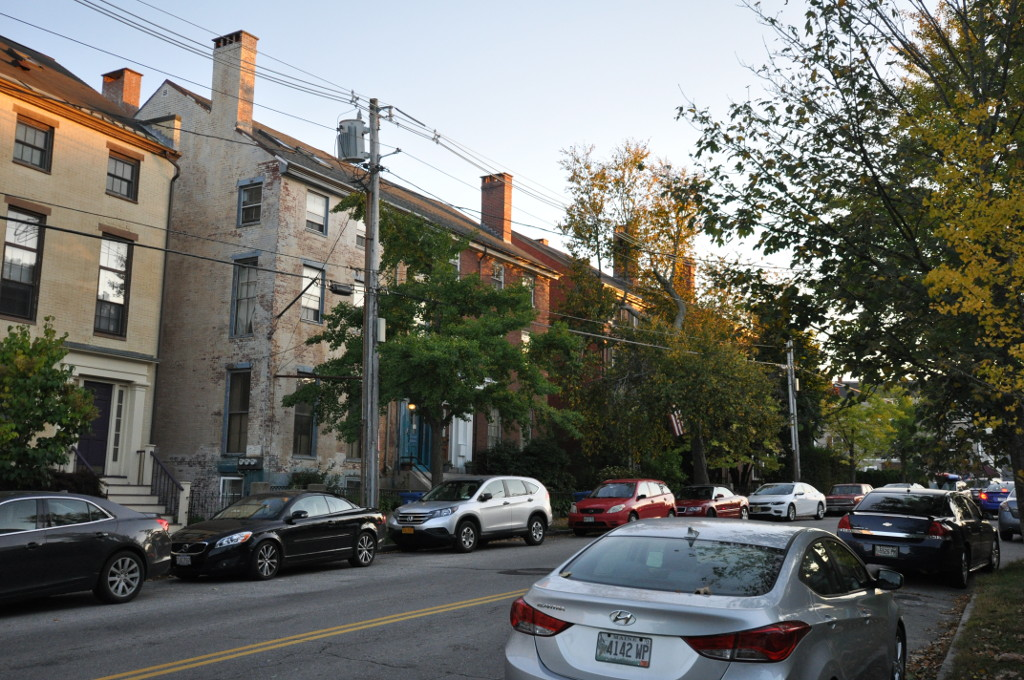
Other townhouses in the district

This series of buildings were built as a speculative real estate development by brothers Eli, Joseph, and Nathaniel Hamblen. It is one of the earliest known examples of this sort of a focused development venture in the state, where they did not even begin until the early 1830s. The development was part of a significant push to develop the area west of the city's main port facilities.

== See also ==
- National Register of Historic Places listings in Portland, Maine
