= Engine Company Number Nine Firehouse =

- U.S. National Register of Historic Places
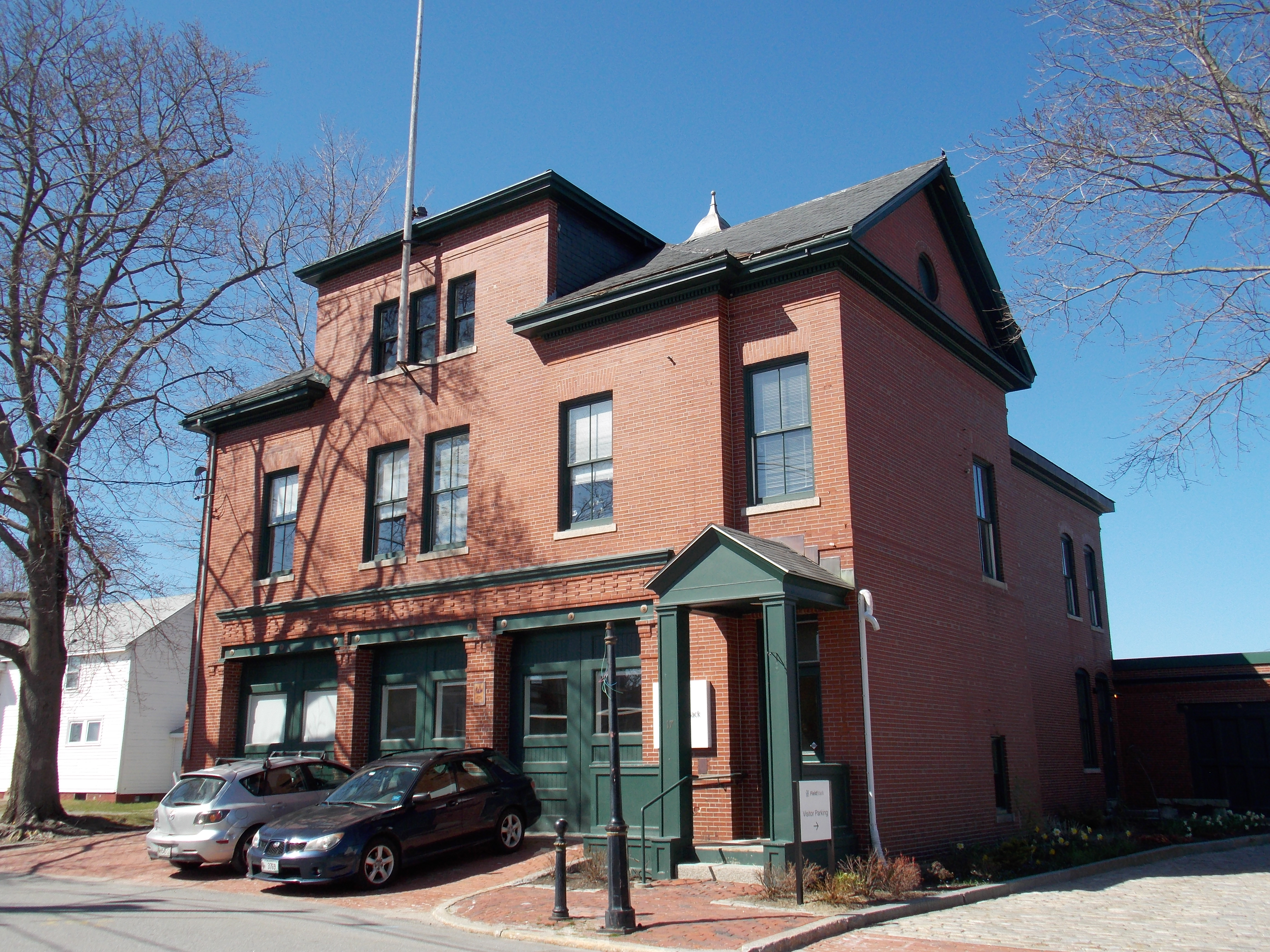

- Location within Maine
- Location: 17 Arbor St. Portland
- Coordinates: 43°41′8″N 70°17′34″W
- Built: 1903
- NRHP reference No.: 10000876
- Added to NRHP: October 28, 2010

Engine Company Number Nine Firehouse, also known as the Arbor Street Firehouse, is a historic former firehouse at 17 Arbor Street in the North Deering neighborhood of Portland, Maine. It was constructed in 1902-03, shortly after Deering was annexed to Portland. It was built to reflect Portland's commitment to the newly annexed suburb as well as due to the city's switch to a paid fire department. It was listed in the National Register of Historic Places in October 2010. It now houses a commercial business.

== Description and history ==
The former Arbor Street Firehouse is located on the north side of Arbor Street, just west of Forest Avenue (United States Route 302), a major artery to downtown Portland, and south of a cluster of road and rail interchanges known as Deering Junction. The building is a 2-1/2 story brick structure, and is three bays wide with a stepped-back fourth bay on the right side. The first floor of the main bays are taken up by equipment bays with two-leaf swinging doors, while the recessed side bay has a pedestrian entrance, sheltered by a gabled porch. The second floor bays have sash windows, the central bay of the three with a pair of them. A wall dormer rises above the central bay, with a group of three smaller sash windows.

The location where the firehouse stands was originally part of Westbrook, and was incorporated as part of the city of Deering in 1892. Deering was then a predominantly residential area, with many of its residents working in Portland. In 1899 it was annexed to Portland, greatly expanding that city's geography. After the annexation, the city's fire department embarked on a plan to update, modernize, and professionalize its force, equipment, and facilities. The Arbor Street station was built in 1902 as part of this process, functionally replacing a nearby wood-frame firehouse that had been built by the city of Deering. At the time of its construction, the equipment was still horse-drawn, and there would have been stables behind the main station. This station housed Engine Number 9 and Ladder Number 4 until 1972, when they moved to a new station on Forest Avenue.

== See also ==
- National Register of Historic Places listings in Portland, Maine
