= Umbrella Cover Museum =

Museum in Peaks Island, Maine

Coordinates: 43°39′22″N 70°11′53″W

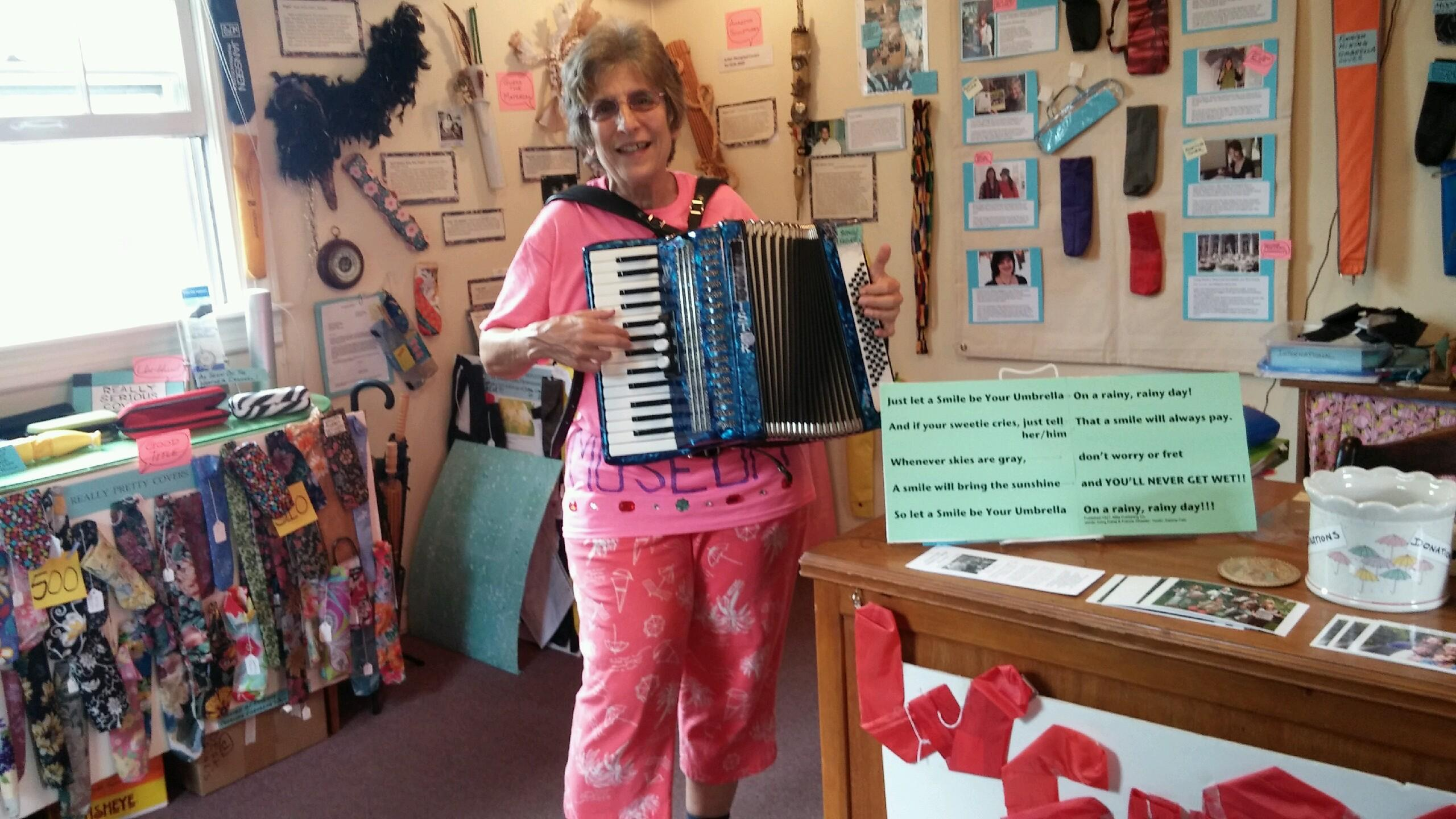
Hoffman is shown playing an accordion while singing "Let a Smile Be Your Umbrella" in the museum. Umbrella covers can be seen in the background.

The Umbrella Cover Museum in Peaks Island, Maine is a museum that pays tribute to umbrella covers. The museum was created and is curated by Nancy 3. Hoffman; she has collected more than 2000 umbrella covers from over 70 countries as of August 2021.

== Background ==
The mission of the Umbrella Cover Museum states that it is "dedicated to the appreciation of the mundane in everyday life. It is about finding wonder and beauty in the simplest of things, and about knowing that there is always a story behind the cover."

The idea for the museum came when Hoffman was cleaning out a closet and came across seven umbrella covers. The museum began in Hoffman's kitchen in 1990, and was moved to a larger location in 2000 as the collection grew. The museum's collection ranges in size from a two-and-a-half-inch Barbie doll cover to a six-foot patio umbrella sleeve. It has hosted special exhibitions including “People and Their Covers” and “New Umbrella Cover Fashions.” Cases are often donated to the museum by those who have lost the umbrellas the cases once belonged to.

On 7 July 2012, Guinness World Records named Hoffman's umbrella cover collection of 730 at the time to be the largest in the world.

The museum is closed during the winter. Guided tours include Hoffman, who is also a musician, singing "Let a Smile Be Your Umbrella" while playing an accordion. Other guided tours include Hoffman, singing the Umbrella Cover Museum theme song (known as "Umbrella Cover"), sung to the tune of "My Bonnie Lies Over the Ocean".
