= Hamblen Block =

Historic house in Maine, United States

- U.S. National Register of Historic Places
- U.S. Historic district – Contributing property
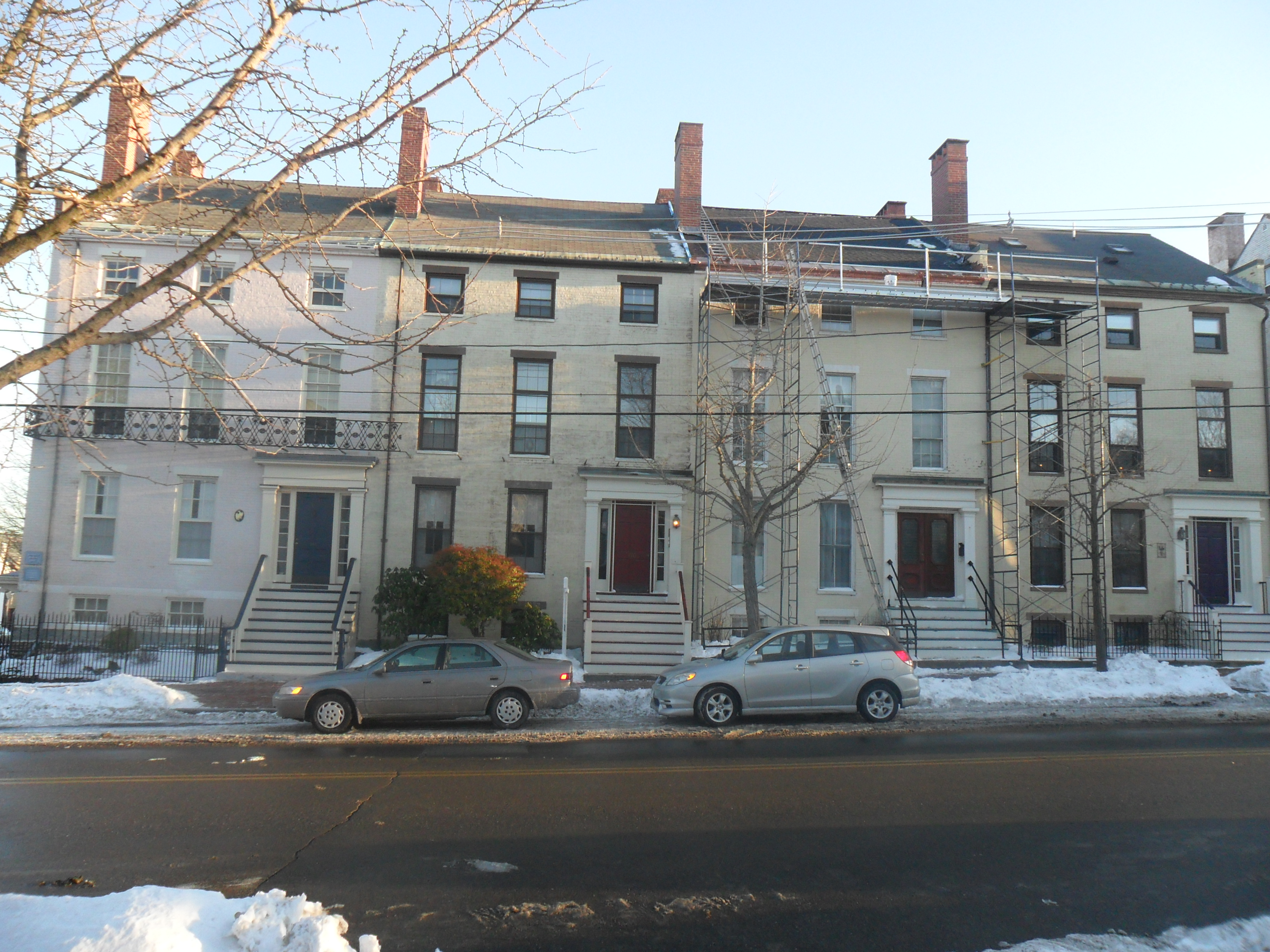
- The Hamblen Block in December 2010

- Location within Maine Location within the United States
- Location: 188-194 Danforth Street, Portland, Maine
- Coordinates: 43°38′54″N 70°15′50″W
- Area: 0.3 acres (0.12 ha)
- Built: 1835
- Architectural style: Greek Revival
- Part of: Hamblen Development Historic District (ID92000802)
- NRHP reference No.: 83000449

Significant dates
- Added to NRHP: July 21, 1983
- Designated CP: June 18, 1992

The Hamblen Block (or Hamblen's Row) is a historic series of four row houses at 188–194 Danforth Street in Portland, Maine, United States. Built in 1835, it is one of the oldest such buildings in the state, and also a rare example, as comparatively few row houses were built anywhere in Maine. The row houses were added to the National Register of Historic Places in 1983, and are a contributing property to the larger Hamblen Development Historic District.

== Description and history ==
The Hamblen Block is located on the east side of Portland's West End neighborhood, on the southeast side of Danforth Street, between Brackett and Clark Streets. It consists of four virtually identical row houses, each three bays wide and three stories high. They are built of brick and have gabled roofs separated by party walls with rectangular brick chimneys projecting from the left side. Entrances are located in the rightmost bay, recessed in an opening flanked by pilasters and topped by an entablature and cornice. One of the units has a later 19th-century two-leaf door, while the others have single doors flanked by sidelight windows.

The row houses were built in 1835 by Nathaniel and Eli Hamblen, developers who were active in pushing the city's development westward from the port area. The only known block of similar age in the state is located in Bangor and has been significantly altered. The Hamblens' development of the area continued with the buildings to the west of this one, which together form the Hamblen Development Historic District.

== See also ==
- National Register of Historic Places listings in Portland, Maine
