= Fifth Maine Regiment Community Center =

- U.S. National Register of Historic Places
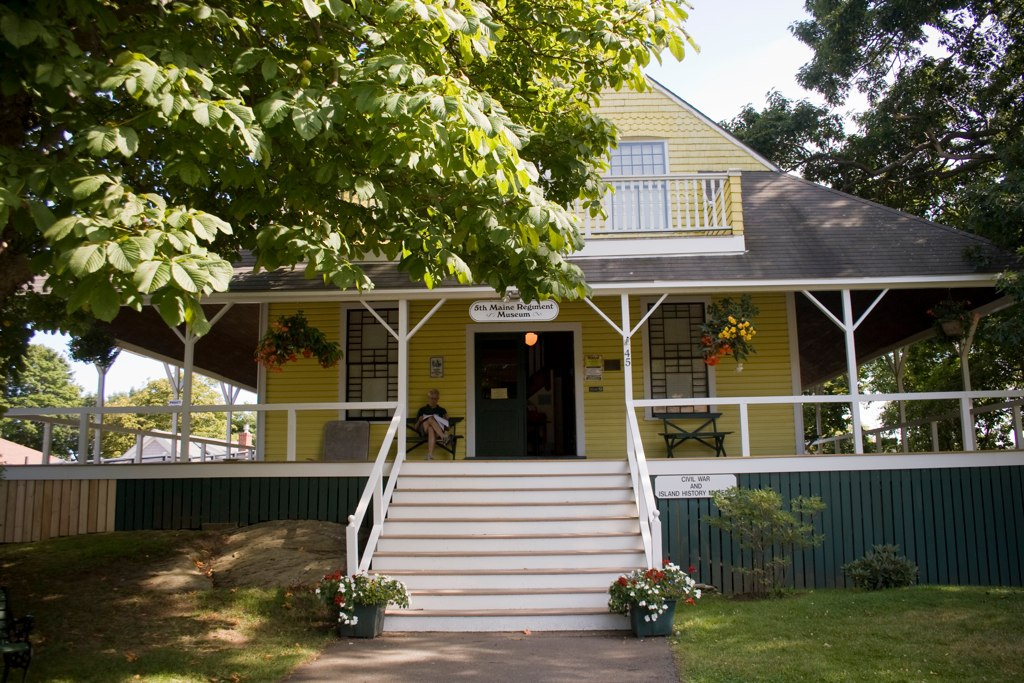

- Location within Maine Location within the United States
- Location: 45 Seashore Avenue, Peaks Island, Portland, Maine
- Coordinates: 43°39′10″N 70°11′36″W
- Area: 1 acre (0.40 ha)
- Built: 1888
- Architectural style: Queen Anne
- NRHP reference No.: 78000169
- Added to NRHP: January 5, 1978

The Fifth Maine Regiment Community Center, now the 5th Maine Museum, is a historic building at 45 Seashore Avenue on Peaks Island, an island neighborhood of Portland, Maine in Casco Bay. It was built in 1888 by American Civil War veterans "as a memorial to their deceased comrades and as a reunion hall for themselves." It was listed on the National Register of Historic Places in 1978 and designated a Greater Portland Landmark in 1984. Today it is open as a museum.

== Construction ==
Peaks Island, the most populous island in Casco Bay, is east of the main Portland peninsula. The Fifth Maine Regiment Community Center is on the south side of the island, facing the channel separating it from Cushing Island.

The community center was built in 1888 and is a notable example of a memorial and clubhouse built in the Queen Anne style. It was built on donated land by a fraternal association of veterans of the 5th Maine Volunteer Infantry Regiment, which sought to memorialize its fallen comrades and to provide a space for regular reunions. The hall features large stained glass windows with panes memorializing deceased soldiers.

The building is a two-story wood frame structure, 2-1/2 stories in height, with a dormered gable roof and a three-story circular observation tower at one corner. The roof extends down to shelter a porch that encircles the building. The exterior walls are finished in wooden clapboards, with bands of decoratively cut wooden shingles. The structure is built directly on a ledge that slopes down to the shore, where there is a rocky beach.

== Museum ==
In 1956 the building was donated to a group of Peaks Island volunteers. The building now operates a Civil War and local history museum as well as an event space.

== See also ==
- Eighth Maine Regiment Memorial, a similar facility also on Peaks Island
- National Register of Historic Places listings in Portland, Maine
