= Gorham's Corner =

Road intersection in Portland, Maine, U.S.

- Road junction in Portland, Maine
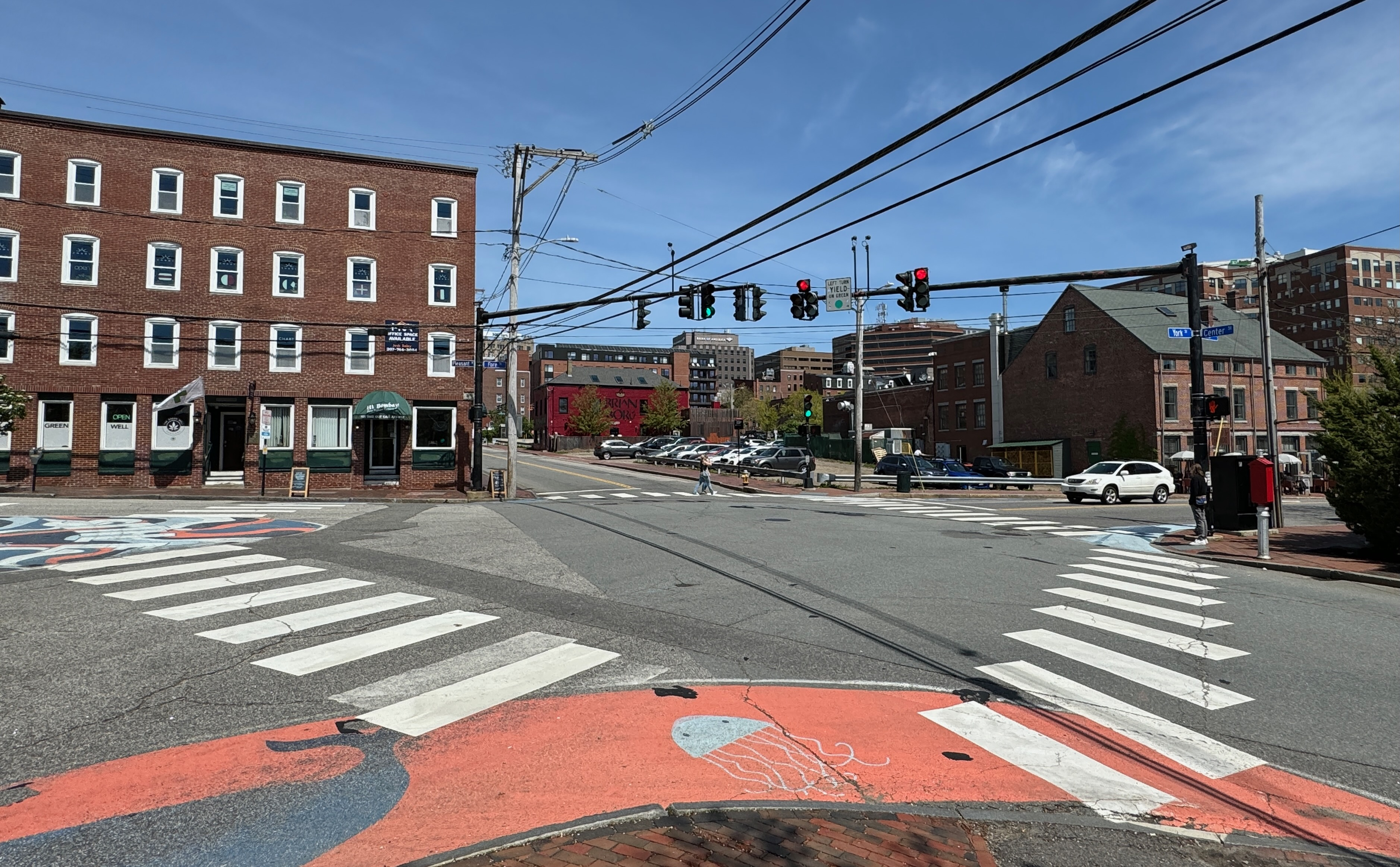
- Viewed in 2024, looking north from the corner of Center Street and York Street
- Interactive map of Gorham's Corner
- Coordinates: 43.6547°N 70.2571°W
- State: Maine
- County: Cumberland
- City: Portland

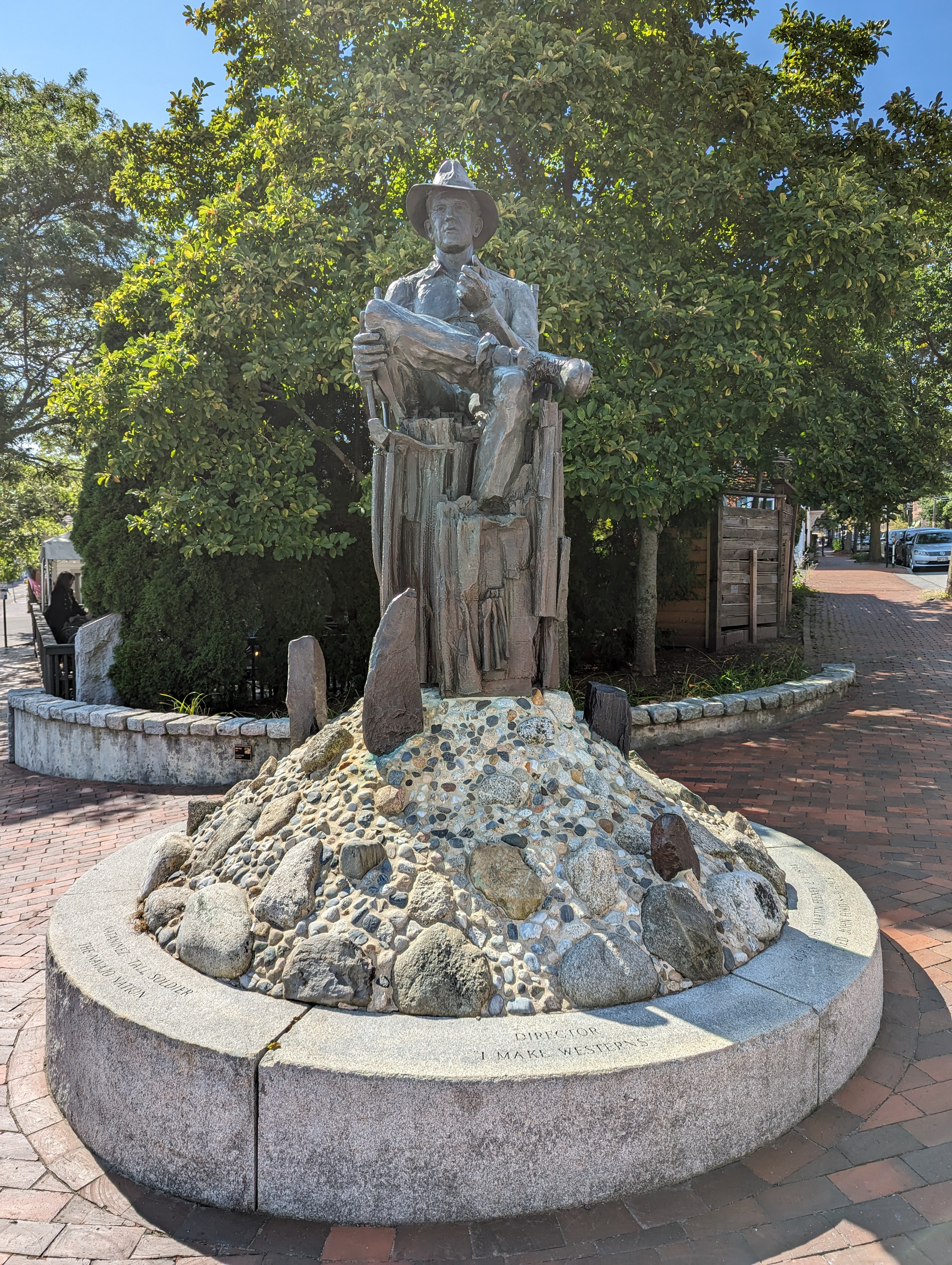
John Ford Statue, between York Street (to the left) and Pleasant Street

Gorham's Corner is a road intersection in Portland, Maine, United States. It is formed by the meeting of Center Street (from the northwest and southeast), Fore Street (from the northeast), York Street (from the south) and Pleasant Street (from the west). The intersection creates five corners for pedestrians to navigate.

In the 19th century, the corner was the focal point of an Irish community, formed after the large emigration to the United States caused by the Great Famine of Ireland.

== History ==
A riot broke out at the corner on February 12, 1854, during which 17-year-old Thomas Guiney was severely injured. He died from his injuries the next day.

In 1945, there was a failed attempt to rename the corner to George W. Sullivan Square. Sullivan was an Army private who was killed during World War II.

In 1998, a statue of John Ford was unveiled on the pedestrian island between Pleasant Street and York Street. Ford grew up near Gorham's Corner. The same year, an interactive history table was installed at the corner of Center Street and York Street, on which the names and histories of prominent individuals are inscribed. The table is made of aluminum and granite.

Pedestrian-friendly changes were made to the intersection in 2023, including the removal of traffic signals in favor of a five-way stop.

== See also ==
- Tracey-Causer Block, 505–509 Fore Street
