= How Houses =

Historic houses in Maine, United States

- U.S. National Register of Historic Places
- U.S. Historic district
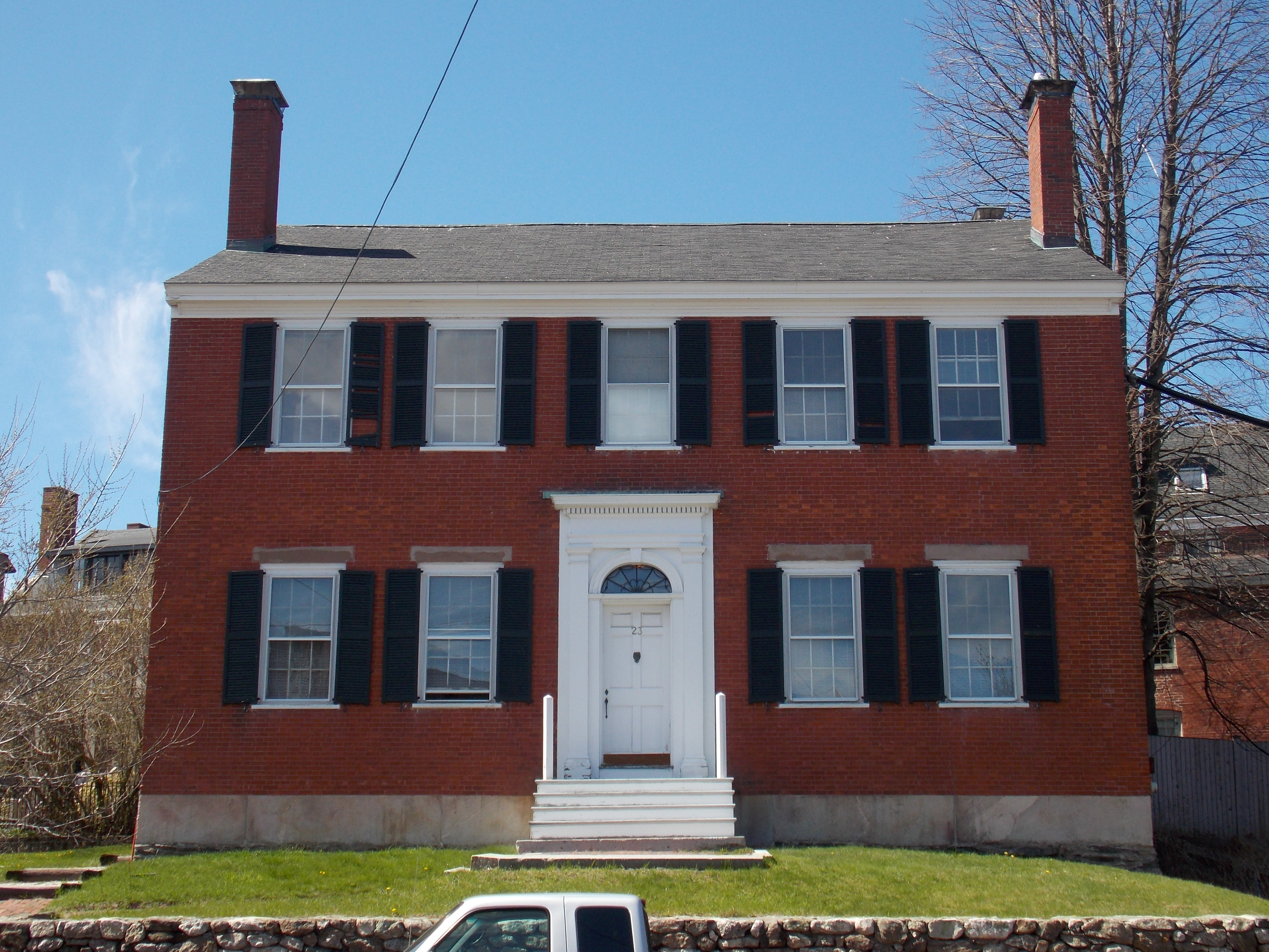
- 23 Danforth St.

- Location within Maine Location within the United States
- Location: 23 Danforth Street and 30–32, 40 Pleasant Street, Portland, Maine
- Coordinates: 43°39′14″N 70°15′30″W
- Area: 1.5 acres (0.61 ha)
- Built: 1799
- Built by: Daniel How, Joseph How
- Architectural style: Federal
- NRHP reference No.: 80000377
- Added to NRHP: January 20, 1980

The How Houses are a trio of Federal period houses on adjacent lots facing Danforth and Pleasant Streets in Portland, Maine. Built between 1799 and 1818, they are a surviving reminder of how the surrounding area was once developed; they are now surrounded by more modern commercial properties. They were listed as a group on the National Register of Historic Places in 1980; the Daniel How House was separately listed in 1973.

== Description and history ==
The first of the How houses to be built is the Daniel How House at 23 Danforth Street. Built in 1799, it is a 2 1/2-story brick building, trimmed with granite, and featuring a Doric entrance portico. It was built by Daniel How, a native of Methuen, Massachusetts, on land belonging to his father-in-law. The second house, that of Daniel's son John, was built by Daniel as a wedding present for his son in 1817. It stands at 40 Pleasant Street, and has similar Federal styling to the father's house. Its entrance is recessed in an archway, with sidelight and fanlight transom windows. The third house, a double house at 30–32 Pleasant Street, was built in 1818 by Daniel's brother Joseph. It is three stories in height, built of brick with granite trim like the others, and has entrances styled similar to those of John's house.

At the time Daniel How built his house, it directly overlooked the waterfront and Casco Bay to the northeast, as Commercial Street, which parallels Danforth on the waterfront, did not exist. The properties have in the intervening years been hemmed in by later commercial development, but are a well-preserved reminder of the area's early 19th-century appearance.

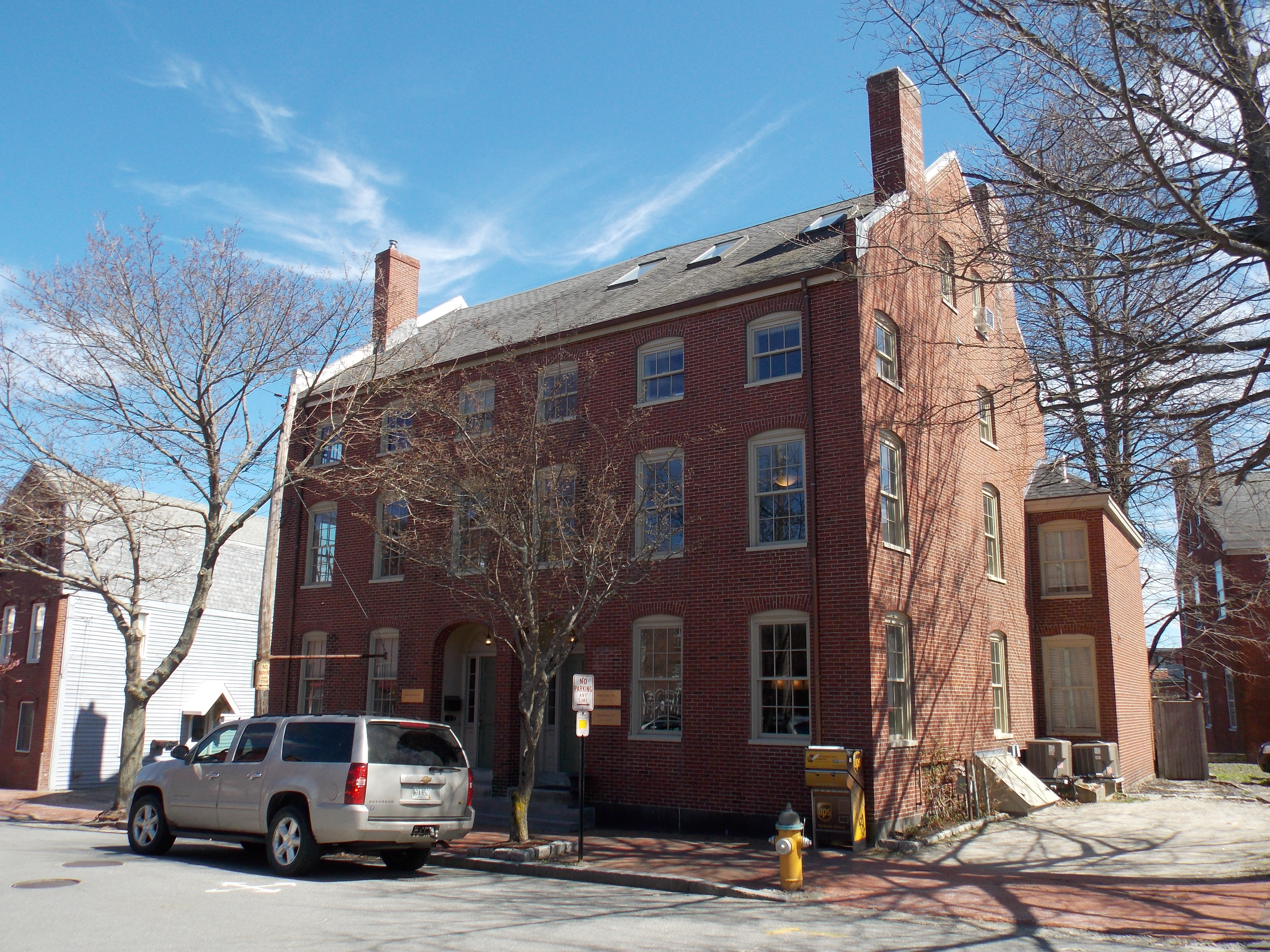
30–32 Pleasant St.

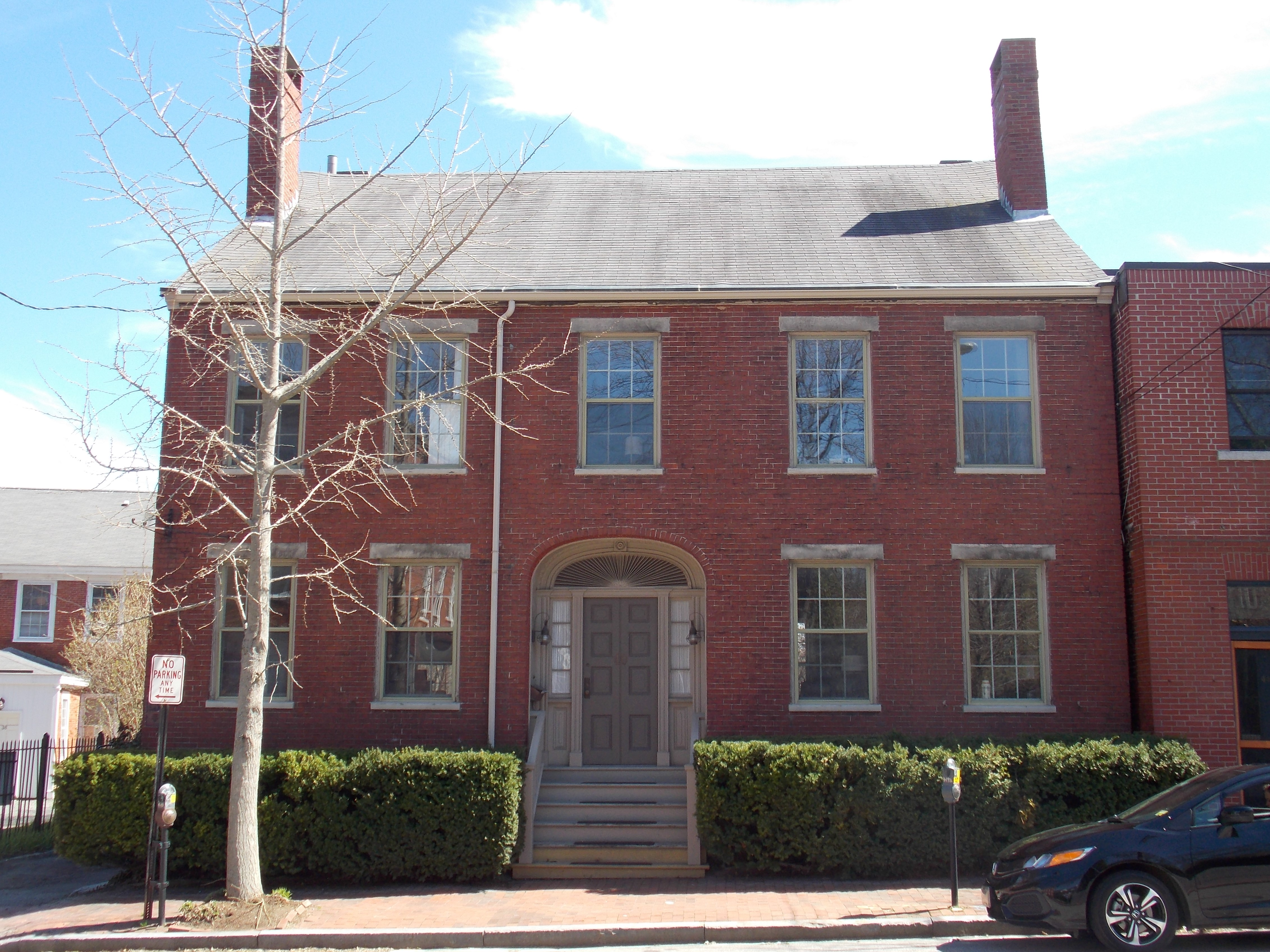
40 Pleasant St.

== See also ==
- National Register of Historic Places listings in Portland, Maine
