= Byron Greenough Block =

- U.S. National Register of Historic Places
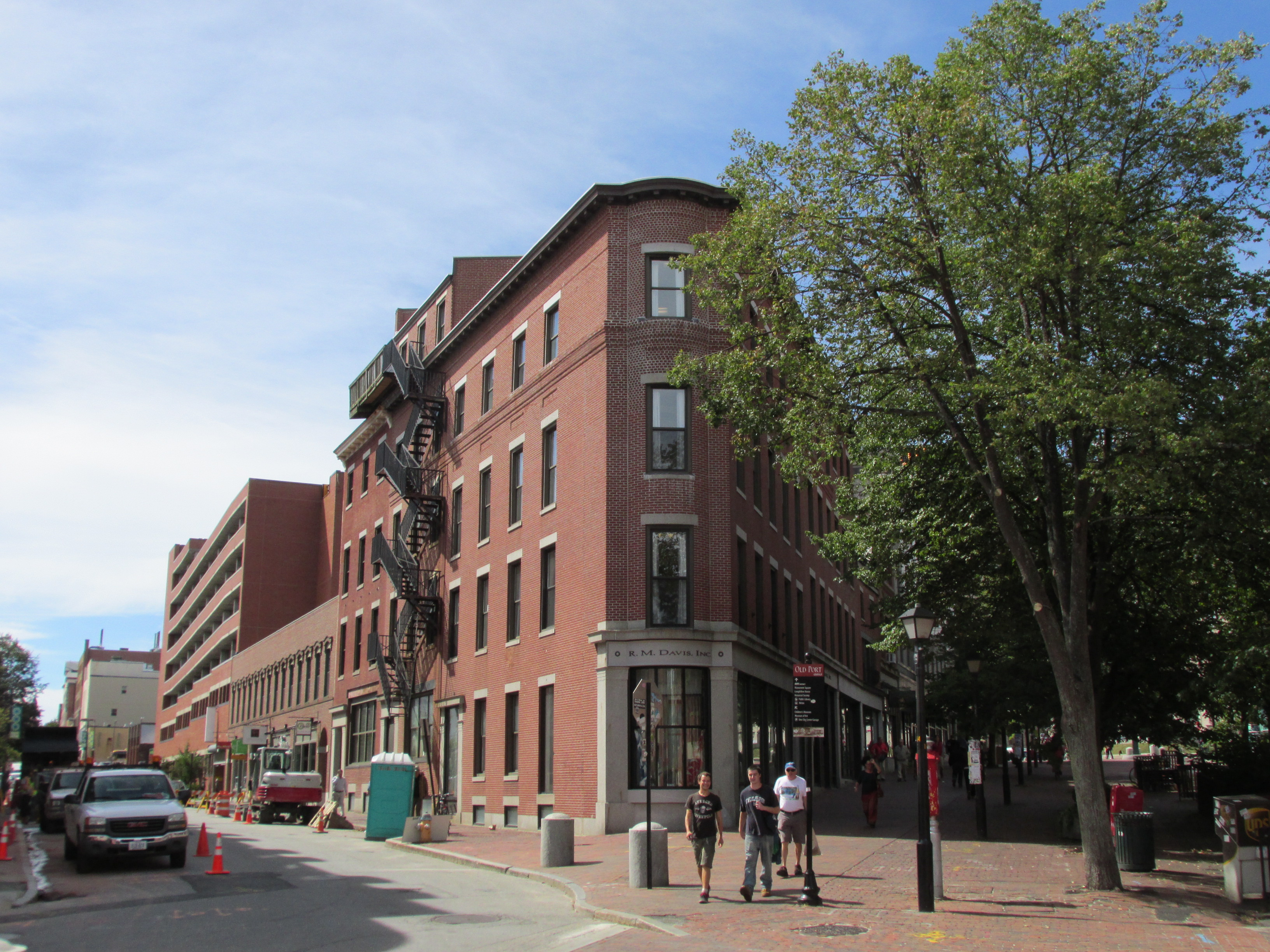
- Pictured in 2013

- Location within Maine Location within the United States
- Location: Free and Middle Streets, Portland, Maine
- Coordinates: 43°39′25″N 70°15′28″W
- Built: 1848 (expanded in 1919)
- Architect: Byron Greenough
- Architectural style: Greek Revival
- NRHP reference No.: 77000065
- Added to NRHP: March 10, 1977

The Byron Greenough Block or Lower Hay Block is a historic commercial building at Free and Cross Streets in downtown Portland, Maine. Built in 1848 and enlarged in 1919 to a design by John Calvin Stevens, it is one of the city's finer surviving Greek Revival commercial buildings. The block was listed on the National Register of Historic Places in March 1977.

== Description and history ==
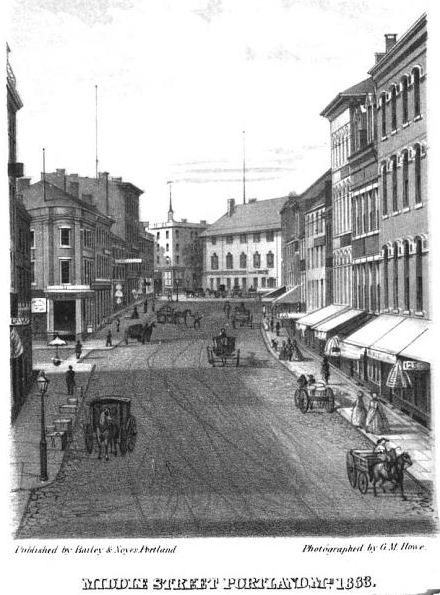
The building (left) in 1863, when it was a three-story structure

The Byron Greenough Block occupies a triangular parcel of land between Federal Street and Free Street in downtown Portland. To its east is a pedestrian area that once carried Middle Street, running southeast from Federal to Free. The building is a four-story masonry structure, built out of brick with granite trim. Its principal facade faces the pedestrian area, and is five bays wide, while a single bay marks the triangular point. The more utilitarian southern facade, facing Free Street, is ten bays wide. The main facade has modern storefronts on the ground floor, with a framing of granite pilasters and lintels. Windows on the upper floors have granite sills and lintels, and there are a series of brick stringcourses (part of the original building cornice) between the third and fourth floors. The current cornice has brick dentil relief and a projecting wooden overhang.

The block, originally three stories, was built in 1848 by Byron Greenough. Greenough made his wealth in hatting and clothier, and ran his business here until 1856, when Henry Homer Hay's apothecary succeeded it. The building notably escaped Portland's 1866 fire, and is consequently one of its few surviving Greek Revival commercial buildings. The architecture firm Stevens and Stevens designed and added the fourth floor.

== See also ==
- National Register of Historic Places listings in Portland, Maine
