= Timberwind (schooner) =

- Timberwind (Schooner)
- U.S. National Register of Historic Places
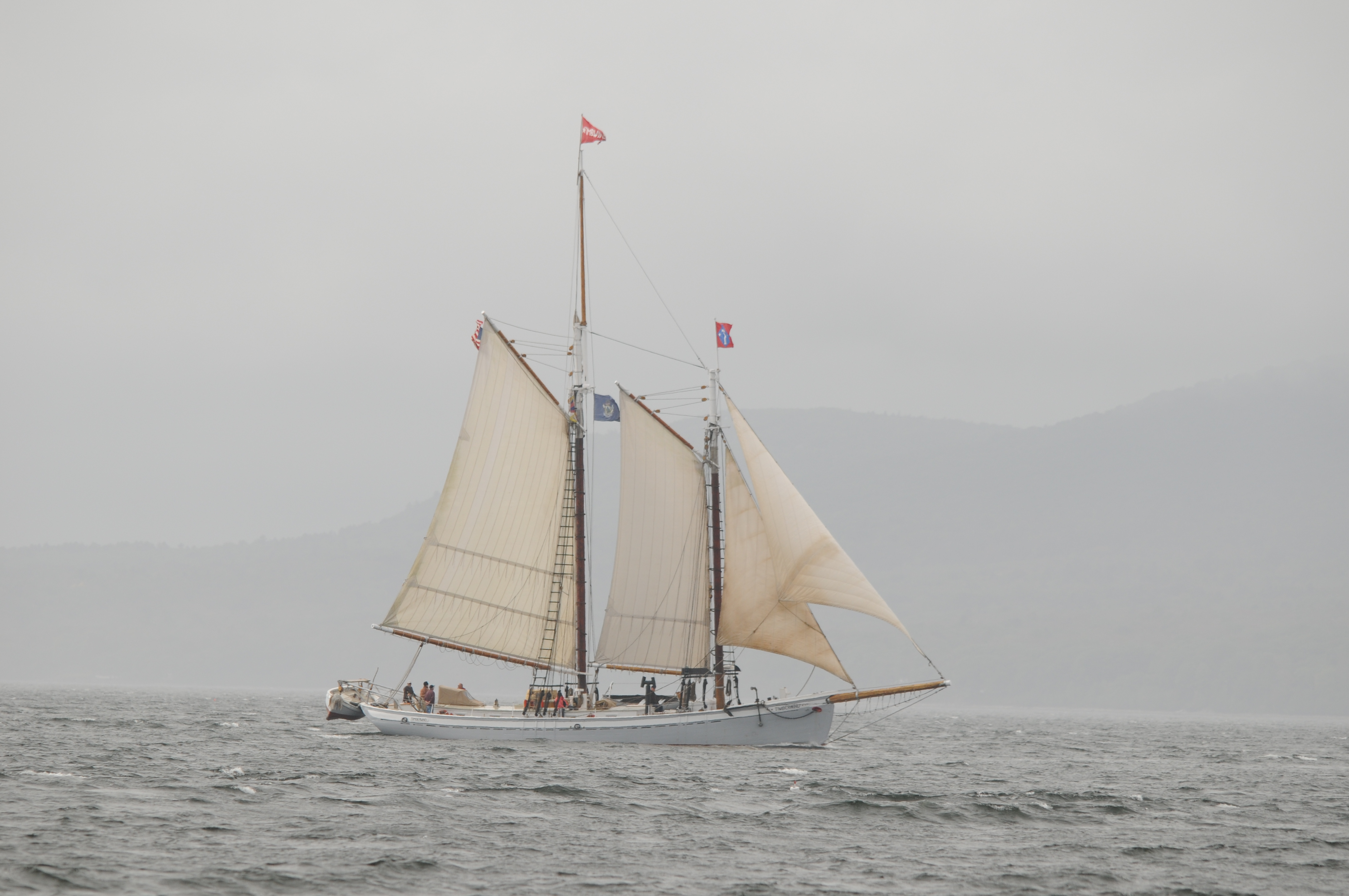

- Location within Maine
- Location: Thompson's Wharf, Belfast Harbor, Belfast, Maine
- Coordinates: 44°25′46″N 69°0′19″W
- Area: less than one acre
- Built: 1931
- Built by: Portland Engineering Co.
- NRHP reference No.: 92000274
- Added to NRHP: March 26, 1992

The schooner Timberwind is a historic former pilot boat, now berthed in Portland, Maine. Built in 1931, she served as a pilot boat (named Portland Pilot) in Portland Harbor until 1969, and was then converted into a schooner as part of the Maine "windjammer" tourist fleet. She is one of a very small number of early 20th-century purpose-built pilot boats that has survived major alteration, and was listed on the National Register of Historic Places in 1992. She moved to Rockport in 1969 and then to Belfast in 2015. She was purchased by the Portland Schooner Company in 2018.

== Description and history ==
Timberwind is a two-masted wooden-hulled sailing vessel. She has a total length of 70 feet (21 m), a beam of 14 feet (4.3 m), and a draft of 10 feet (3.0 m). She has an oak frame, and is sheathed in yellow pine below the water line and oak above it. The deck planking is yellow pine. She is presently rigged as a schooner, although she has carried a number of different sail configurations in her service history, and the bowsprit used in the rig was added as part of the ship's conversion to tourist service. She is fitted with two marine engines located midships, and was originally fitted with crew living, sleeping, and dining quarters belowdecks.

The Portland Pilot's Association was formed in the early 20th century as a method to organize the activities of the private harbor pilots who brought large ships into the Port of Portland. The association's first pilot boat, the Director, was commissioned and built in 1906. Due to increasing demand, a second boat was commissioned and built in 1931 entering service in December of that year. The Portland Pilot's design is said to be based on that of the Director and a local fishing schooner. She served as a pilot boat until 1969, except for a period during World War II, when she was commandeered by the United States Coast Guard for patrol duty in the harbor's outer reaches. From 1969 to 1971 she underwent conversion for use as a tourist boat in Camden, and has served as a "windjammer" offering daily cruises to tourists.

The Schooner Timberwind is currently owned by Portland Schooner Company in Portland, Maine. The Timberwind offers day sales and private charters from May through October.

== See also ==
- List of schooners
- National Register of Historic Places listings in Portland, Maine
