= John Ford Statue =

Statue of John Ford by George Kelly at Gorham's Corner in Portland, Maine, U.S.

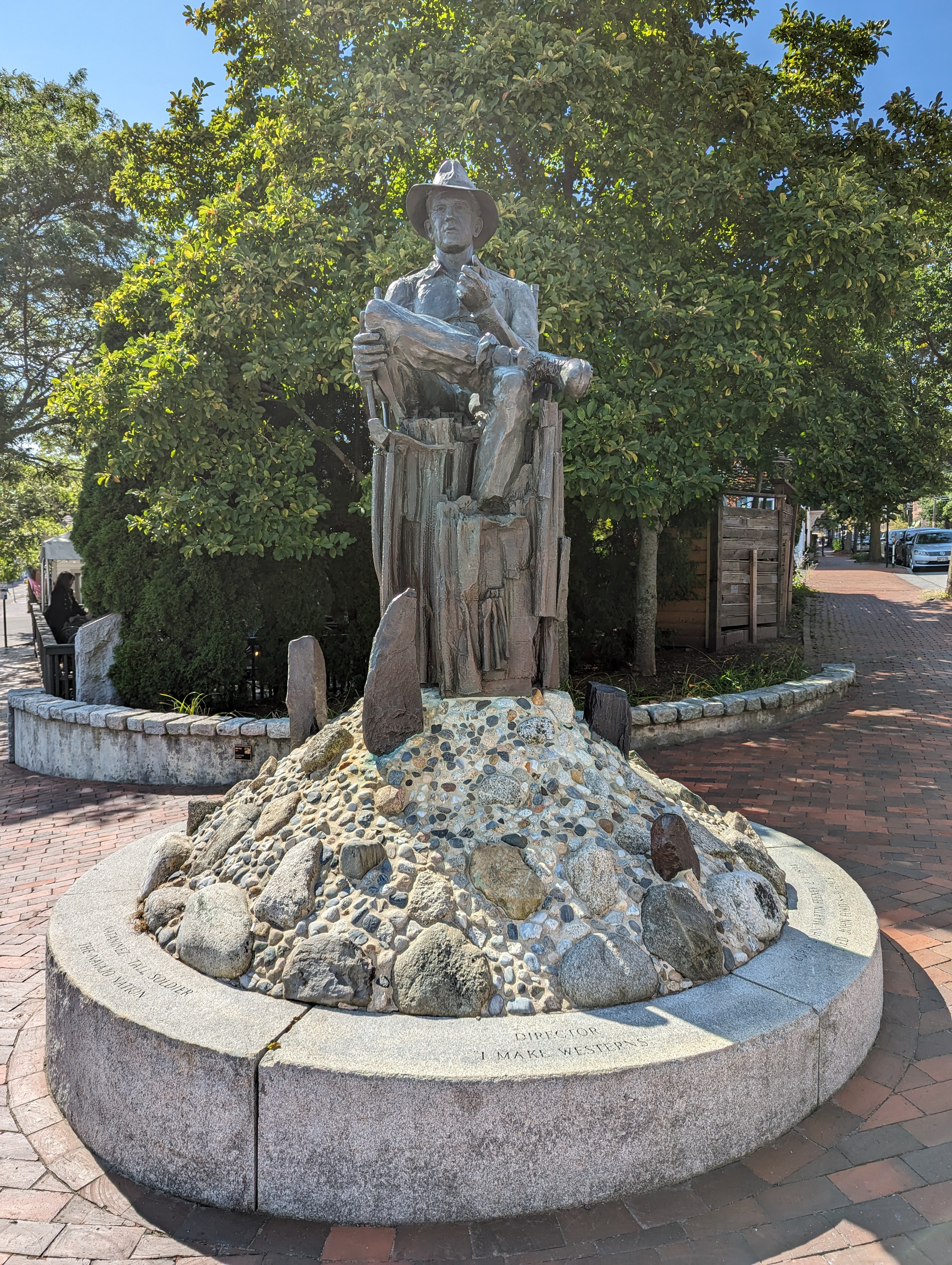
- Artist: George Kelly
- Year: 1998
- Type: Bronze and granite
- Dimensions: 300 cm (120 in)
- Location: Portland, Maine; 43°39′16.6″N 70°15′26.3″W

John Ford Statue, alternatively titled The John Ford Statue or simply John Ford, is a bronze statue of American film director John Ford (1894–1973) sculpted by George Kelly. Located in the historically Irish neighborhood of Gorham's Corner in Portland, Maine, the statue was unveiled in 1998 and funded by Ford's friend, philanthropist Linda Noe Laine.

== Description ==
The statue depicts a life-sized Ford seated in a director's chair wearing a wide-brimmed hat and holding a pipe. According to Public Art Portland, the "director’s chair sits on a rock base that represents the rock formations of Monument Valley in Utah and Arizona, where Ford shot many of his westerns". Ford's statue sits across from a spot in Gorham's Corner where a grocery store owned by his Irish immigrant father once stood. The granite base of the statue lists several of Ford's accomplishments and honors, as well as a blunt description of Ford: "Director" and a quote from Ford, "I make westerns".

Around the base of the statue is a small plaza with six stones inscribed with descriptions of the films that won Ford each of his six Academy Awards - four for Best Director and two for Best Documentary. In chronological order, the films featured are:

- The Informer (1935)
- The Grapes of Wrath (1940)
- How Green Was My Valley (1941)
- The Battle of Midway (1942)
- December 7th (1943)
- The Quiet Man (1952)

== Background and history ==
Ford was born John Martin Feeney in Cape Elizabeth, Maine, on February 1, 1894. He grew up in Portland, graduating from Portland High School and moving to California to pursue filmmaking in the early 1910s. He was inspired to do so after his brother, Francis Ford, began making a career for himself as a film actor. Ford visited Portland often throughout his life to see his family. Ford reportedly once told a friend "I love Portland, but I don’t even know if they like me".

In the early 1990s, Linda Noe Laine, a philanthropist from Louisiana and friend of Ford's, visited Portland. After seeing that there was "not even a plaque to honor the distinguished director", Laine obtained city approval in 1996 to install a statue in the city for Ford. Laine funded the project herself, with the statue being sculpted by New York sculptor George Kelly. The statue was unveiled, at Gorham's Corner, on July 12, 1998.
