= Sagamore Village Historic District =

Public housing development in Portland Maine

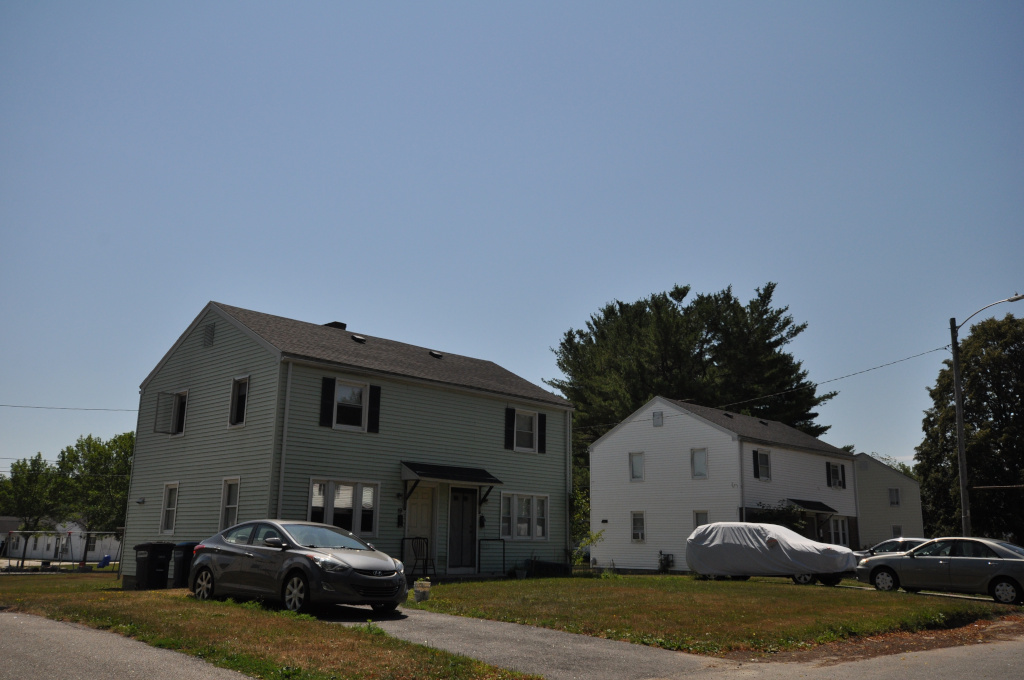

Sagamore Village Historic District is a public housing community in Portland, Maine. Located in Nason's Corner neighborhood, it contains 200 housing units. As of 2019, there were 538 residents, 243 of which were aged 20 and under.

== History ==
It was built by the Federal Housing Administration in 1941 to house war industry workers during World War II. It was designed by John Howard Stevens and John Calvin Stevens II, local architects and the descendants of John Calvin Stevens. The buildings were listed on the National Register of Historic Places in 2020.
