= Daniel How House =

Historic house in Maine, United States

- U.S. National Register of Historic Places
- U.S. Historic district – Contributing property
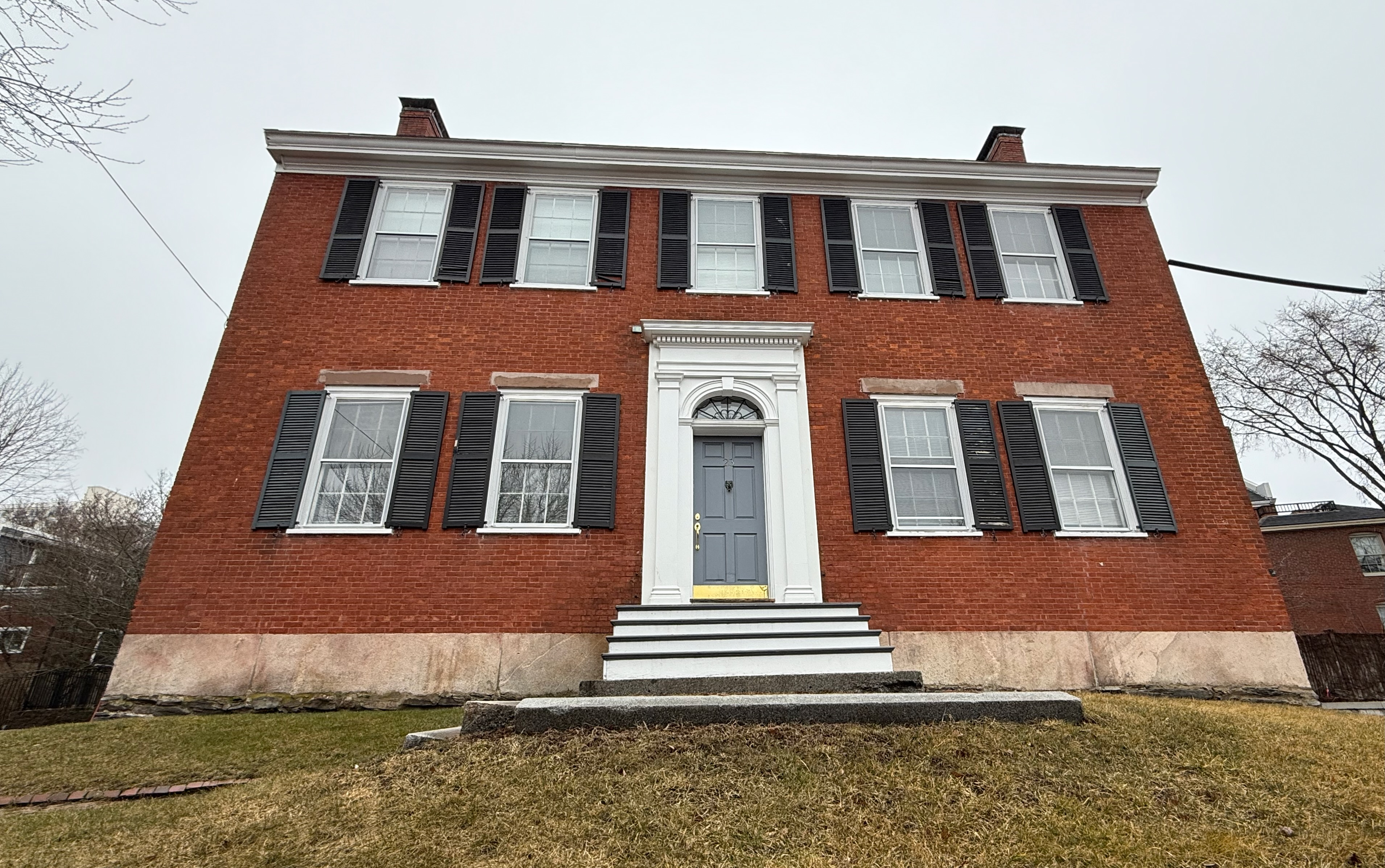
- The building in 2025

- Location within Maine Location within the United States
- Location: 23 Danforth St., Portland, Maine
- Coordinates: 43°39′14″N 70°15′30″W
- Area: less than one acre
- Built: 1799
- Architectural style: Colonial, Federal
- Part of: How Houses (ID80000377)
- NRHP reference No.: 73000265

Significant dates
- Added to NRHP: April 24, 1973
- Designated CP: January 20, 1980

The Daniel How House is an historic house at 23 Danforth Street in Portland, Maine. Built in 1799, it is one of the oldest surviving residences on Portland's Neck, notably surviving the city's great 1866 fire. It is an excellent and well-preserved local example of Federal period architecture. It was listed on the National Register of Historic Places in 1973.

== Description and history ==
The Daniel How House stands on the north side of Danforth Street, near its eastern end just uphill from Portland's commercial waterfront. It is a 2 1/2-story brick structure, built from locally sourced bricks laid in common bond. Windows have brownstone lintels, and the main entrance is a sympathetic recreation of a period entrance, the original having been lost. The building's interior retains most of its original woodwork and flooring, with a particularly fine central staircase. The house was used for many years as a tenement, and underwent a major restoration in the early 1970s.

At the time Daniel How built his house, it directly overlooked the waterfront and Casco Bay to the northeast, as Commercial Street, which parallels Danforth on the waterfront, did not exist. Located behind the house on Pleasant Street are two slightly later houses, which were built by other members of the How family. They have in the intervening years been hemmed in by later commercial development, but the cluster of three homes is a well-preserved reminder of the area's early 19th-century appearance.

== See also ==
- National Register of Historic Places listings in Portland, Maine
