= Greenwood Garden Playhouse =

- Location within the United States Location within Maine
- Interactive map of Greenwood Garden Playhouse
- Location: Peaks Island, Maine, U.S.; 43.65385°N 70.19916°W
- Opened: 1884
- Signature attractions: Open-air roller skating rink Theater

Greenwood Garden Playhouse was a theater on Peaks Island, Maine, United States. Completed in 1884, as an open-air roller skating rink, it was converted to a theater in 1898. It became a dance hall prior to its closure in 1957 as a summer stock theater. Jean Stapleton's first professional appearance in the summer of 1941 was in a production at the playhouse. Martin Landau also made his professional stage debut in a 1951 production of Detective Story at Greenwood Garden, where for several seasons he was a resident cast member.

Its grounds featured a carousel, a Ferris wheel and a wooden observation tower, which people paid to be able to view Mount Washington, the highest mountain in the Northeastern United States.

The playhouse was located on Garden Place, just off Island Avenue, near the southwestern tip of the island.

In 2021, the garden was added to the National Register of Historic Places.

== See also ==
- National Register of Historic Places listings in Portland, Maine
