= Loring House Apartments =

- Portland City Hospital
- U.S. National Register of Historic Places
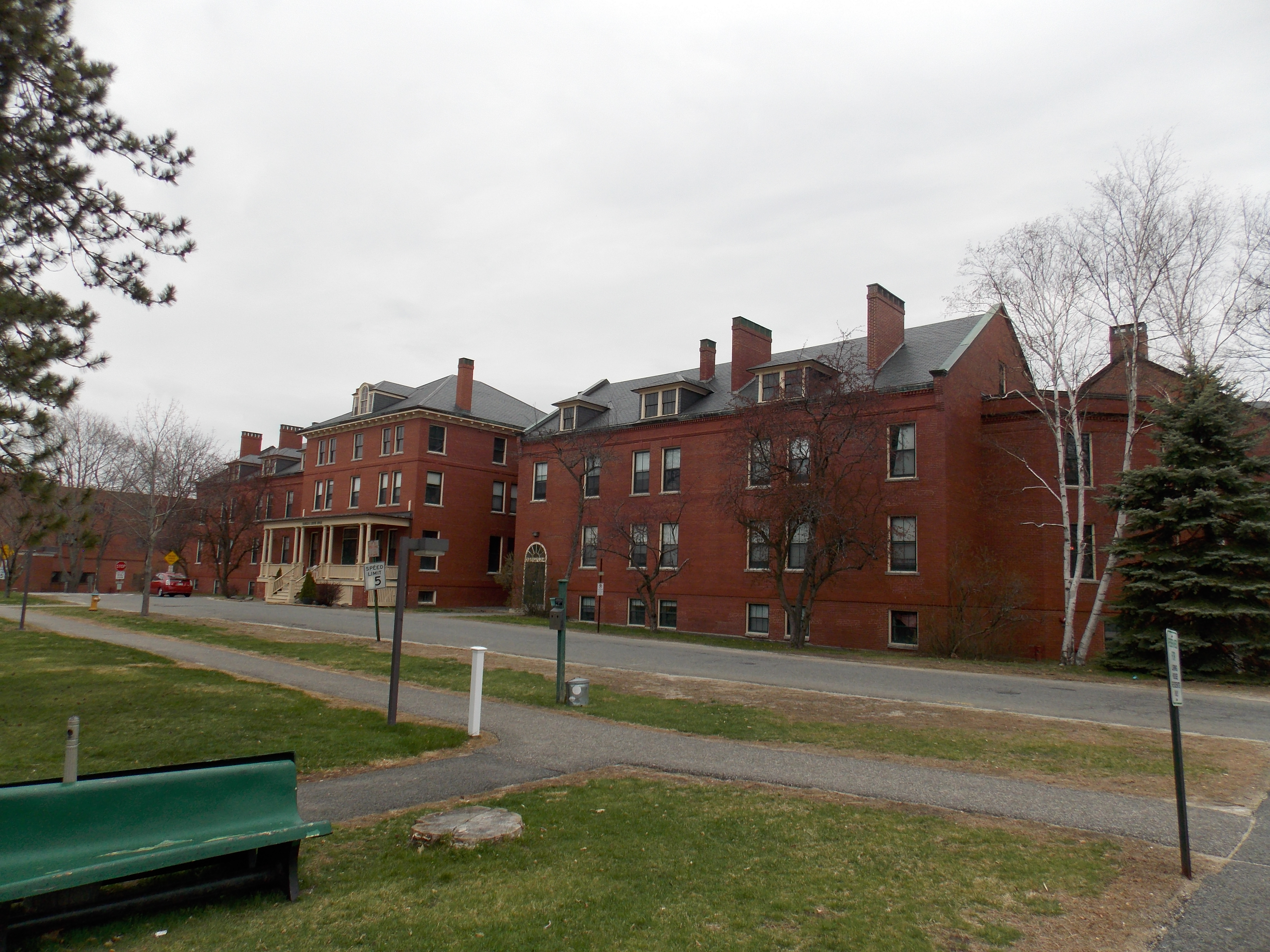

- Location within Maine Location within the United States
- Location: 1125 Brighton Ave. Portland, Maine
- Coordinates: 43°40′37″N 70°19′31″W
- Area: 1.5 acres (0.61 ha)
- Built: 1902
- Architect: F. H. & E. F. Fassett
- Architectural style: Colonial Revival
- NRHP reference No.: 85000612
- Added to NRHP: March 21, 1985

The Loring House Apartments are a senior housing complex at 1125 Brighton Avenue in Portland, Maine. They occupy the buildings of the Portland City Hospital, built in 1902-04 as the city's poor house. The complex was designed by the prominent local firm of F. H. & E. F. Fassett, and was listed on the National Register of Historic Places in 1985.

== Description and history ==
The Loring House Apartments occupy a landscaped parcel of 1.5 acres (0.61 ha) in Portland's Nasons Corner neighborhood. It is set on the north side of Brighton Avenue (Maine State Route 25), just east of the point where it crosses Interstate 95. It consists of a cluster of 2-1/2 story brick buildings, with a central 3-1/2 story main building, all linked together by connecting wings. The outer buildings are only modestly styled, with hipped or gabled roofs, and windows set in segmented-arch openings. The main building has more elaborate Colonial Revival elements, including a balustraded porch, and a hip roof with modillioned cornice. A central dormer is filled with a Palladian window.

Portland has been providing some sort of facilities for the assistance of the indigent since the 18th century. This property was built in 1902-04 for the "convenience and economy" of providing such facilities in a single place. This type of facility fell out of fashion in the second quarter of the 20th century, and it was then converted into a hospital, providing subsidized medical services to the city's poor. In the early 1980s it was converted to senior housing.

== See also ==
- National Register of Historic Places listings in Portland, Maine
