= Nathaniel Dyer House =

Historic house in Maine, United States

- U.S. National Register of Historic Places
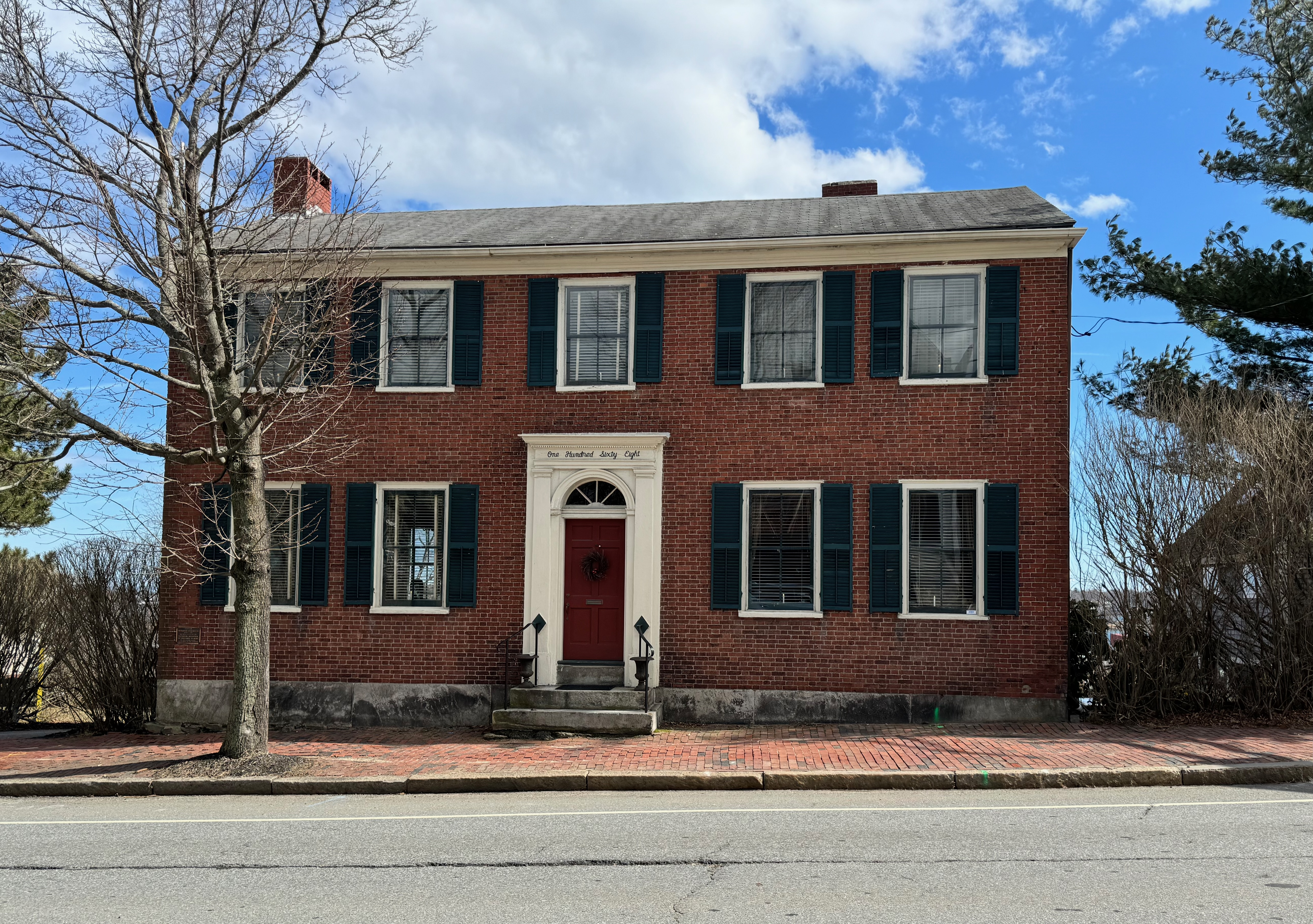
- The Nathaniel Dyer House in 2024

- Location within Maine Location within the United States
- Location: 168 York St., Portland, Maine
- Coordinates: 43°38′57″N 70°15′38″W
- Area: less than one acre
- Built: 1803
- NRHP reference No.: 86003534
- Added to NRHP: April 15, 1987

The Nathaniel Dyer House is an historic house at 168 York Street in Portland, Maine. Built in 1803, it is one of the city's oldest surviving brick houses, rare for the building material and for its scale, which is for a middle-class family of the period. The house was listed on the National Register of Historic Places in 1987.

== Description and history ==
The Dyer House is located on the Portland peninsula, south of the main commercial port area, overlooking the Fore River at the northeast corner of York Street and the approach road to the Casco Bay Bridge. It is a 2 1/2-story masonry structure, built out of brick laid in Flemish bond on the front facade, and in English bond elsewhere. The main facade is five bays wide and symmetrical, with a center entrance flanked by Federal-style pilasters and topped by a half-round transom and entablature. A two-story brick ell extends back from the right rear. The interior has a central-hall plan, with a narrow central hall that houses a winding staircase. The staircase newels are not original, but are from the same period as the house, taken from a nearby house also owned at one time by the Dyers. The woodwork is generally modest Federal-period woodwork, about 90% original, with crown molding in the rightside parlor.

The house was built in 1803 for Nathaniel Dyer, who had earlier settled in nearby Cape Elizabeth, and was engaged in shipbuilding and shipping. At the time of its construction only 26 of Portland's 576 houses were brick, and most were more elaborate. This house remained in the family until 1959.

== See also ==
- National Register of Historic Places listings in Portland, Maine
