= Peaks Island =

Island in Casco Bay, Maine

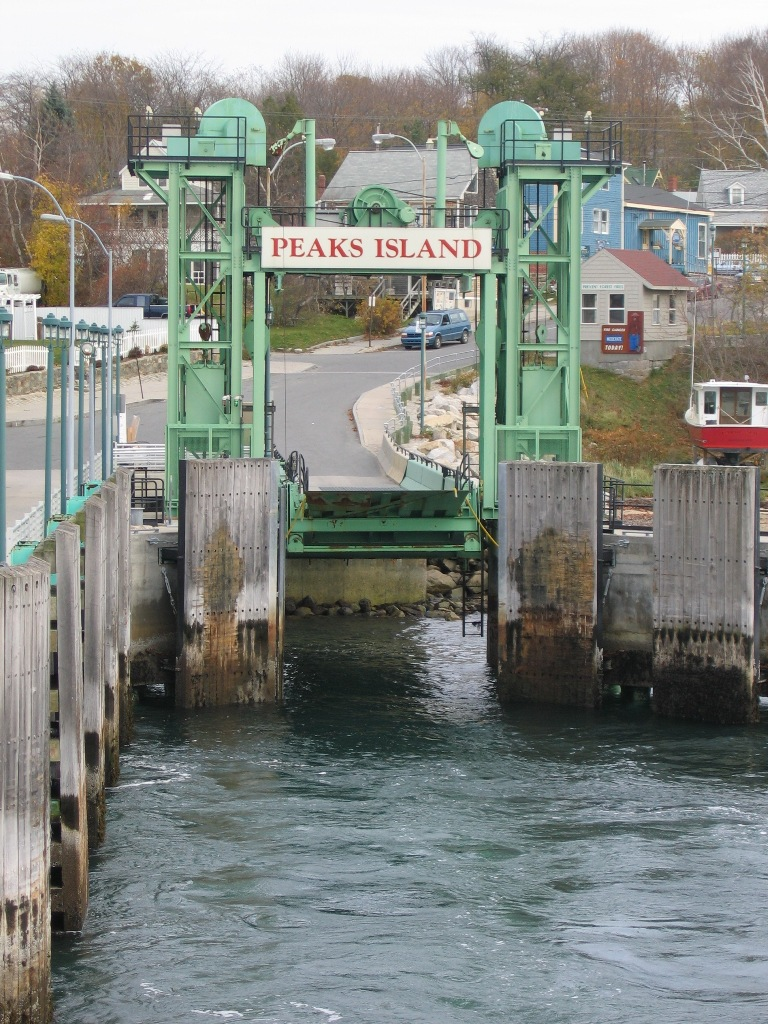
- Photo of ferry landing and Welch Street on Peaks Island, Maine
- Interactive map of Peaks Island

Geography
- Location: Casco Bay, Maine
- Coordinates: 43°39′25″N 70°11′46″W
- Adjacent to: Gulf of Maine
- Area: 720 acres (290 ha)

Demographics
- Population: 927 (2011–2015)

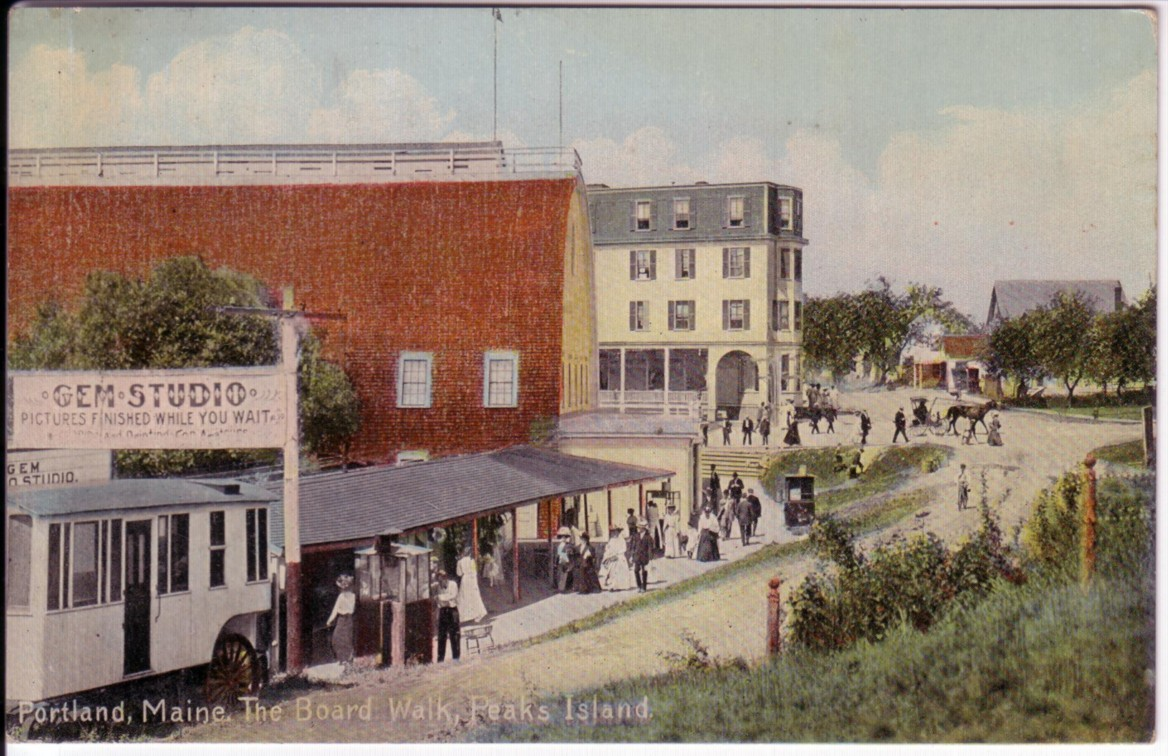
Vintage postcard depicting Gem Theater, boardwalk, and the Peaks Island House hotel on Peaks Island, Maine

Peaks Island is the most populous island in Casco Bay, Maine, and the second largest by land area among islands under the municipal jurisdiction of Portland. About three miles (4.8 km) from downtown, the island is served by Casco Bay Lines and has its own elementary school, library, and police station.

While small, the island has a variety of businesses, including an ice cream parlor, restaurant, grocery store, kayak rentals, golf cart rentals, art galleries, the Fifth Maine Regiment Museum, and the Umbrella Cover Museum.

== History ==
At the time European explorers arrived on the Maine coast, the Wabanaki people foraged and hunted on Casco Bay islands in the warmer months including on Peaks Island.

Peaks Island was originally known as Pond Island. It became Michael's Island after Michael Mitton took a 60-year lease on the island in 1637 from his father-in-law George Cleeve. In 1661, Mitton's widow conveyed the island to a Boston merchant named John Phillips, and the island became known as Munjoy's Island for Phillips' son-in-law George Munjoy. In about 1670, the island became known as Palmer's Island for Munjoy's son-in-law John Palmer.

By 1670, Munjoy built a structure known as the Stone House that came under attack during a Wabanaki raid in 1675 during King Philip's War, with the family's fate unknown. The house was attacked again in 1676 after a group of mainland settlers taking refuge on nearby Cushing Island sought food on Peaks, and coming under attack attempted to defend themselves from the Stone House.

Warriors used Peaks Island in 1689 as a rendezvous point for an assault on Fort Loyal on Falmouth Neck, during King William's War.

By 1741, the island was known as Peaks Island, with the possibility the name stemmed from Joseph Peake, a soldier who may have lived on the island while serving in a militia company led by Capt. Dominicus Jordan.

At the time of the American Revolution, the island had three houses belonging to Thomas Brackett, Benjamin Trott Sr., and Col. John Waite Jr.

Peaks Island opened its first schoolhouse in 1832, with the building also used as a meeting house for church sermons.

During a September 1869 hurricane, the schooner Helen Eliza was shipwrecked just off Peaks Island, with 11 of the vessel's crew of 12 perishing.

The Peaks Island Steamboat Company was established in 1871 to provide ferry service to Portland, with the company eventually folded into a predecessor company of Casco Bay Lines.

In the 1880s, Peaks Island would come to be known as "the Coney Island of Casco Bay" for its burgeoning Greenwood Gardens amusement district for tourists arriving from Portland by ferry. Anchored by the 1,500-seat Gem Theater, the district also had a Ferris wheel, observation tower, boardwalk, dance hall, bowling alley, inns and dining establishments.

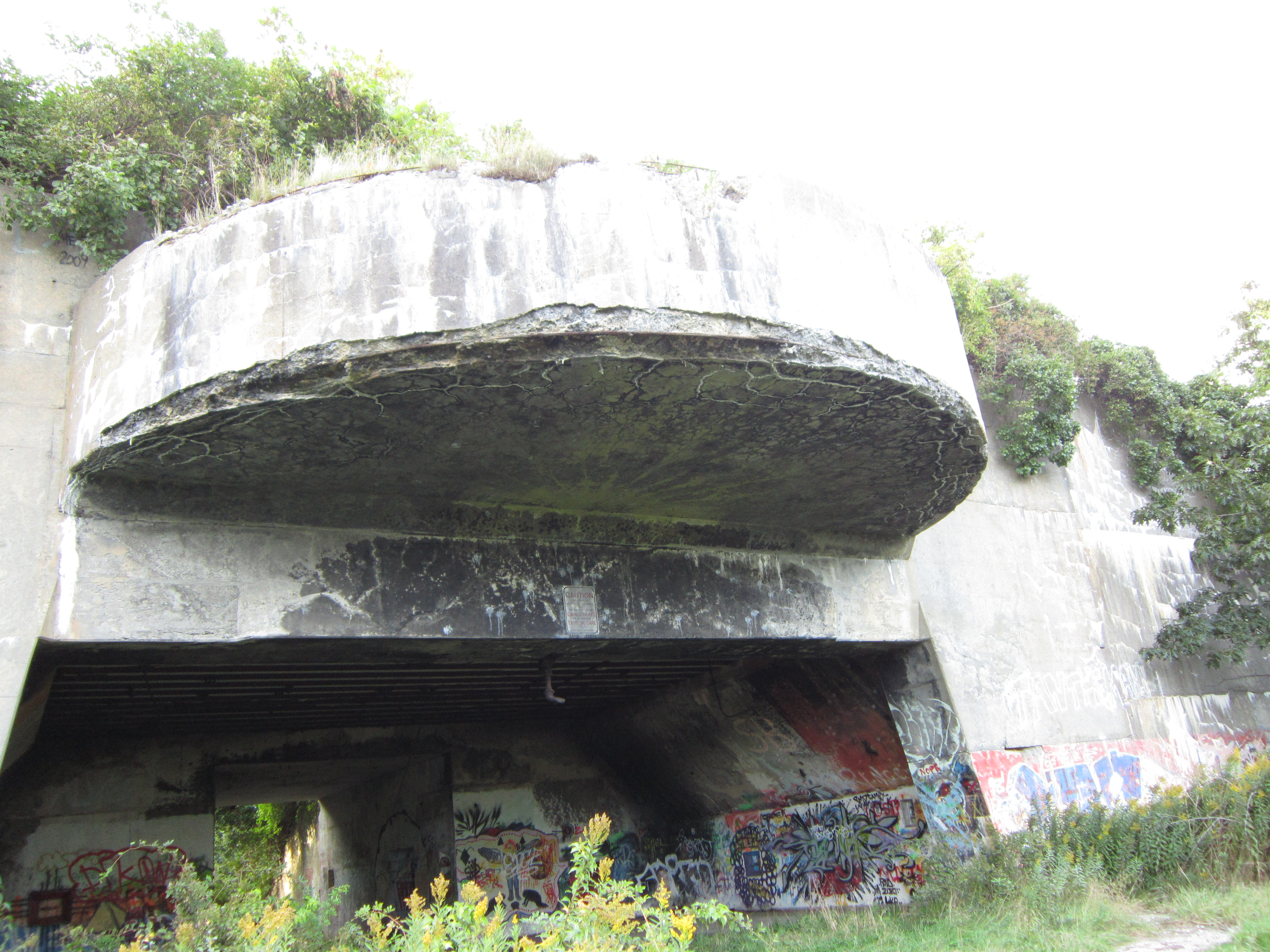
Battery Steele housed two 16-inch (406 mm) guns

In the 20th century, George M. Cohan staged productions at the island's Gem Theater before debuting them on Broadway in New York City. Jean Stapleton's first professional appearance was in a 1941 production at Greenwood Garden Playhouse. Martin Landau made his professional stage debut in a 1951 production of "Detective Story" at Greenwood Garden, where for several seasons he was a resident cast member.

The Gem Theater was destroyed by fire on September 7, 1934. In a 1936 fire, the Union House Hotel burned down, as did a row of stores on the north side of Island Ave., including Augustus Carlson's Restaurant, Brackett's Grocery, Small's Bakery, John Cox's gift shop, and eight cottages.

During World War II, the island was home to a large military defense installation, including the largest structure, Battery Steele, which housed two 16-inch (406-mm) guns. When Battery Steele's guns were first tested, windows on the opposite side of the island shattered.

== Population ==
The island had an estimated population of 858 in 2017; its population increases in the summer by 2,000 to 4,000.

== Secession efforts ==
There have been at least six significant movements for Peaks to secede from the city of Portland: in 1883, 1922, 1948, 1955, 1992, and between 2004 and 2011. The most recent effort grew out of a revaluation of the municipality's properties, when average property taxes on Peaks Island increased by over 200 percent. Shortly thereafter, a group of island residents organized a committee to investigate seceding from Portland and forming a separate town. A successful petition drive put the issue to an island-wide vote on June 13, 2006. Of a total of 683 votes, over 57 percent were in favor of secession.

The Portland City Council unanimously opposed secession. The council and the secession group, after arguing over whether to hold talks in public or private, failed to negotiate terms. In February 2007 the secession group obtained sponsorship for legislation in the Maine State Legislature to incorporate the Town of Peaks Island, subject to a successful referendum. After vigorous debate, the bill was narrowly tabled, "dead" in committee as of May 14, 2007.

As a result of the secession fight and the urging of state legislators, the Portland City Council agreed to create a seven-member Peaks Island Council for direct liaison. But in 2010 most members of the Peaks Island Council resigned, expressing frustration with Portland's unwillingness to work with them. With only write-in candidates taking the vacant seats, the council ceased to fulfill its function. Ongoing discussions between city officials and the council's former chair about establishing some degree of autonomy, such as creating a village corporation within the city, proved unproductive.

As a result of a change in the Maine legislature from Democratic to Republican control, the secession effort regained momentum, with a new bill introduced in 2011 providing for a January 2012 island-wide vote on secession. But hearings showed an apparent lack of consensus among the islanders. The State and Local Government Committee rejected the bill on the ground that the secession leaders had not followed the legal process: they would need to start over with signature gathering and another referendum.

== See also ==
- List of islands of Maine
- Peaks Island Land Preserve
