= Timeline of Portland, Maine =

The following is a timeline of the history of the city of Portland, Maine, United States, from its settling in 1633 to the present day.

== 17th century ==
- 1632 - Casco settled.
- 1658 - Settlement renamed "Falmouth."
- 1659 - George Munjoy settled what became Munjoy Hill.
- 1668 - Eastern Cemetery established.
- 1676 - Village sacked by the Wampanoag during King Philip's War.
- 1690 - Battle of Fort Loyal.

== 18th century ==
- 1718 - Town of Falmouth established.
- 1740 - First Parish Church built.
- 1763 - Falmouth Library Society organized.
- 1764 - Population: about 2,000.
- 1768
  - Portland Fire Department formed.
  - Portland Farmers' Market established.
- 1775
  - Thompson's War
  - Town burned by British.
- 1785 - Falmouth Gazette newspaper begins publication.
- 1785/1786 - Peleg Wadsworth built what became known as the Wadsworth-Longfellow House.
- 1786 - Falmouth renamed "Portland."
- 1790
  - Gazette of Maine newspaper began publication.
  - Population: 2,240.
  - Lighthouse built.
- 1791 - 159–161 Fore Street, the 1807 birthplace of Henry Wadsworth Longfellow, built.
- 1794 - Fort Sumner built.
- 1796 - Portland Marine Society incorporated.

== 19th century ==
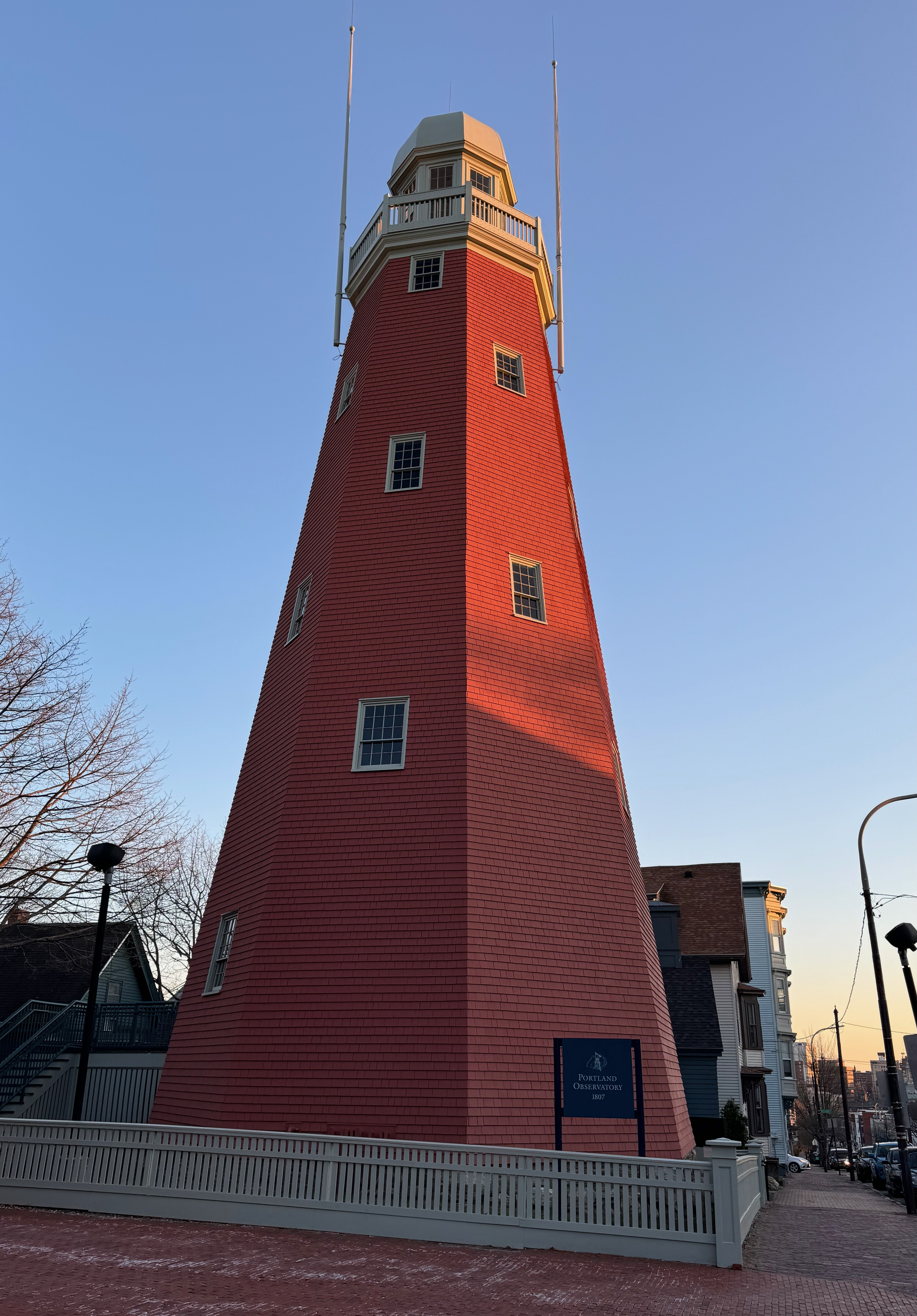
Portland Observatory

- 1800 - Population: 3,704.
- 1803
  - Eastern Argus newspaper began publication.
  - United States Hotel built in Haymarket Square (today's Monument Square).
- 1805 - Portland Benevolent Society incorporated.
- 1806 - Gorham Academy built.
- 1807
  - Portland Observatory built.
  - Birth of Henry Wadsworth Longfellow.
- Queen's Hospital opened (later renamed Northern Light Mercy)
- 1819 - State constitutional convention held.
- 1820
  - Portland became the capital of the State of Maine.
  - Maine Council of Royal Masters instituted.
  - Population: 8,581.
- 1821
  - High School established.
  - Maine Mineralogical Society established.
  - Maine Encampment of Knight Templars established.
- 1822 - Maine Historical Society founded.

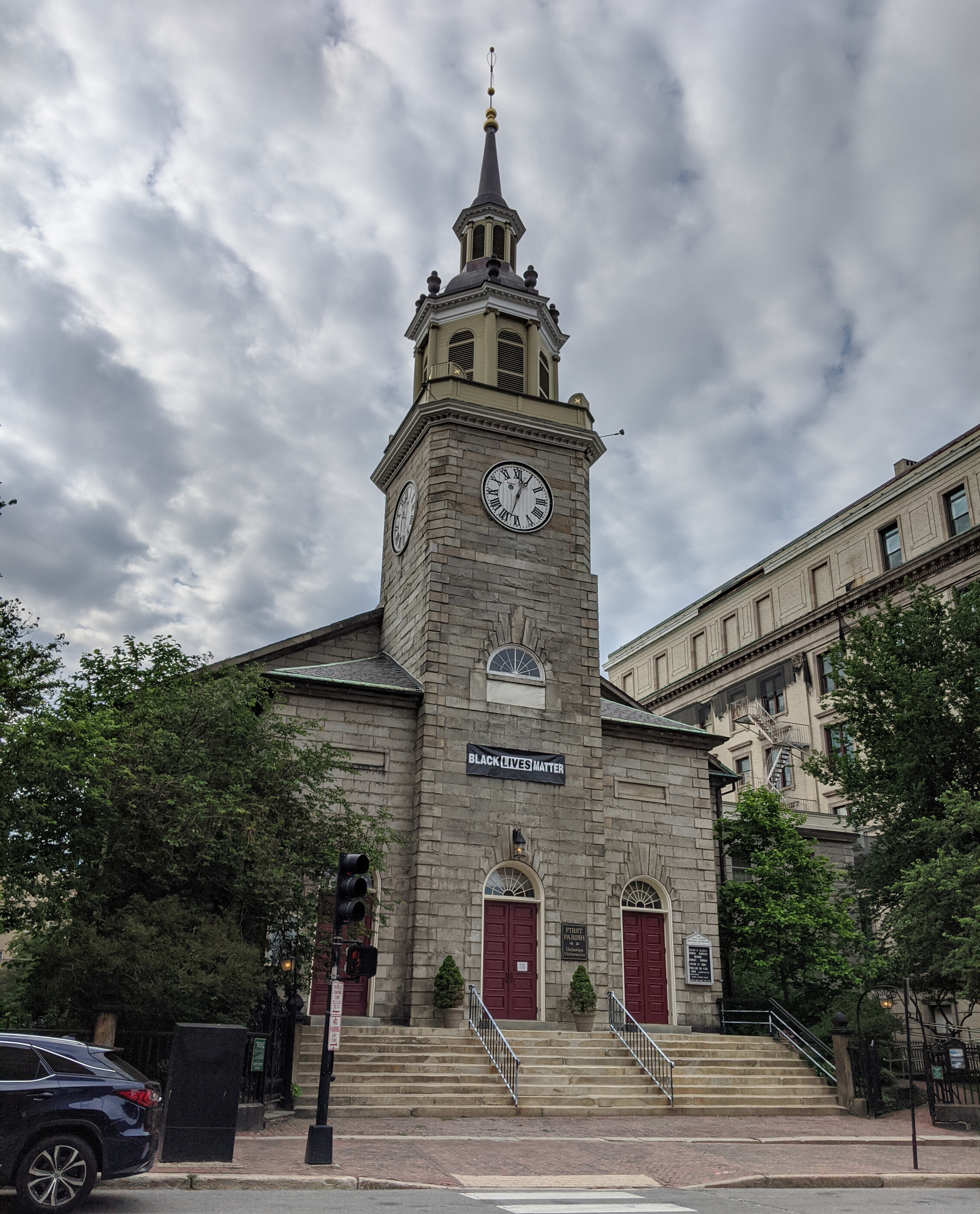
First Parish Church

- 1825
  - First Parish Church built.
  - Market (or Haymarket) House built Haymarket Square.
- 1826 - Portland Athenaeum founded.
- 1827 - John Neal opened the first public gymnasium in the U.S. founded by an American in the Market House.
- 1828
  - Maine's first literary periodical, The Yankee, founded by John Neal.
  - Abyssinian Meeting House established.
  - Mariner's Church built.
- 1829
  - Theatre built on Union Street.
  - Western Cemetery established.
- 1830 - Population - 12,598.
- 1831 - Westbrook Seminary chartered.
- 1832
  - State capital moved from Portland to Augusta.
  - City of Portland chartered.
  - Cumberland and Oxford Canal opened bringing interior trade to Portland harbor from Long Lake.
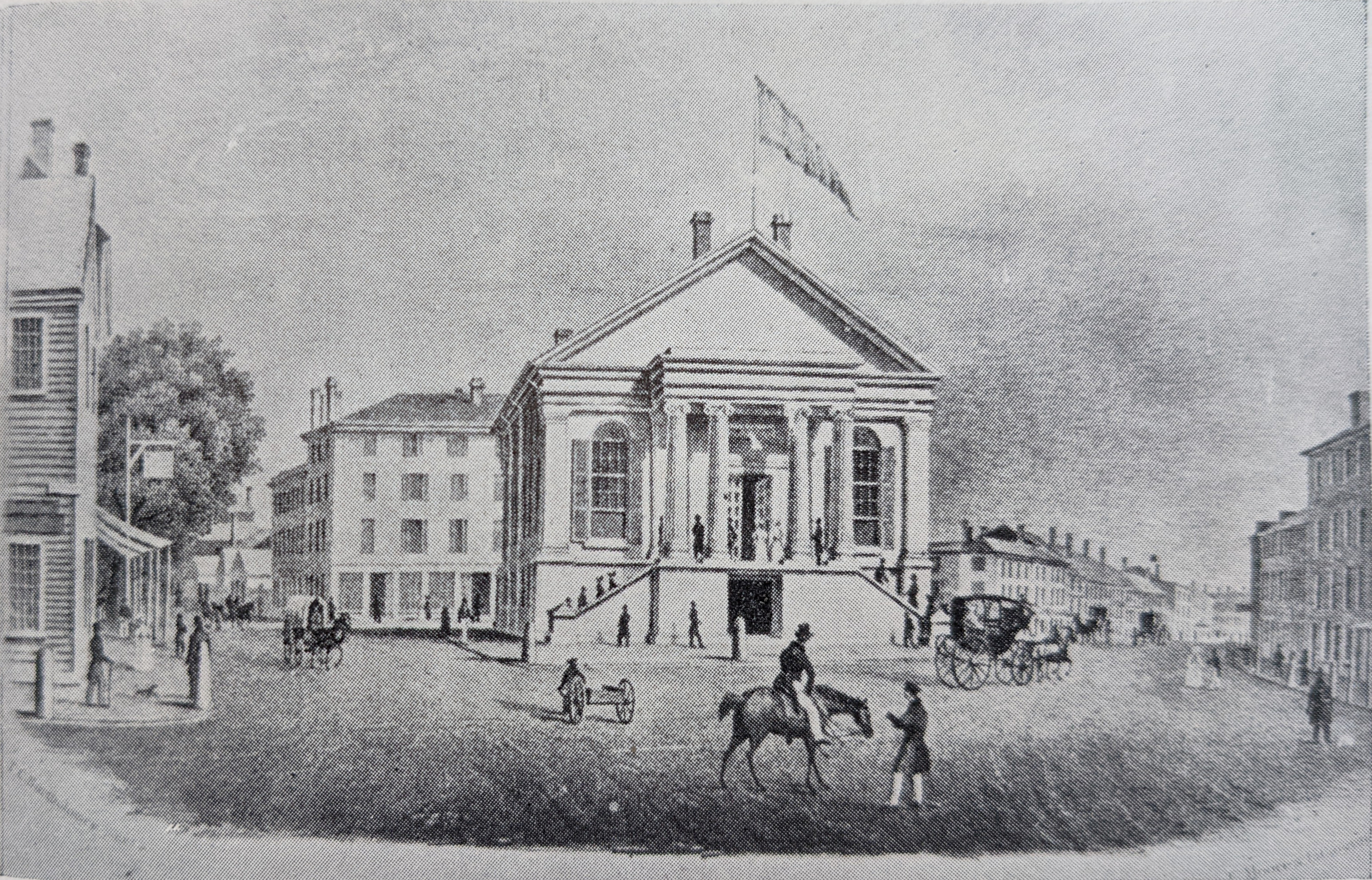
- Original City Hall
  1833 - Market House converted into Portland's first City Hall.
- 1834 - Sylvester Graham Riot at the Temple Street Church.
- 1836 - Western Promenade laid out.
- 1839 - B. Thurston & Co. publishers established.
- 1843
  - Railway service began between Boston and Portland.
  - Portland Society of Natural History organized.
- 1844 - Portland Steam Packet Company organized.
- 1845 - The Pleasure Boat newspaper began publication.
- 1846 - Portland Company established to build railway locomotives.
- 1849 - Portland Gas Light Co. incorporated.
- 1850
  - Population: 20,815.
- 1851 - Kennebec and Portland Railroad began operating.
- 1852 - Commercial Street completed on land reclaimed from the Fore River estuary.
- 1853
  - Grand Trunk Railway to Montreal began operating.
  - Portland Board of Trade established.
  - Roman Catholic Diocese of Portland established.

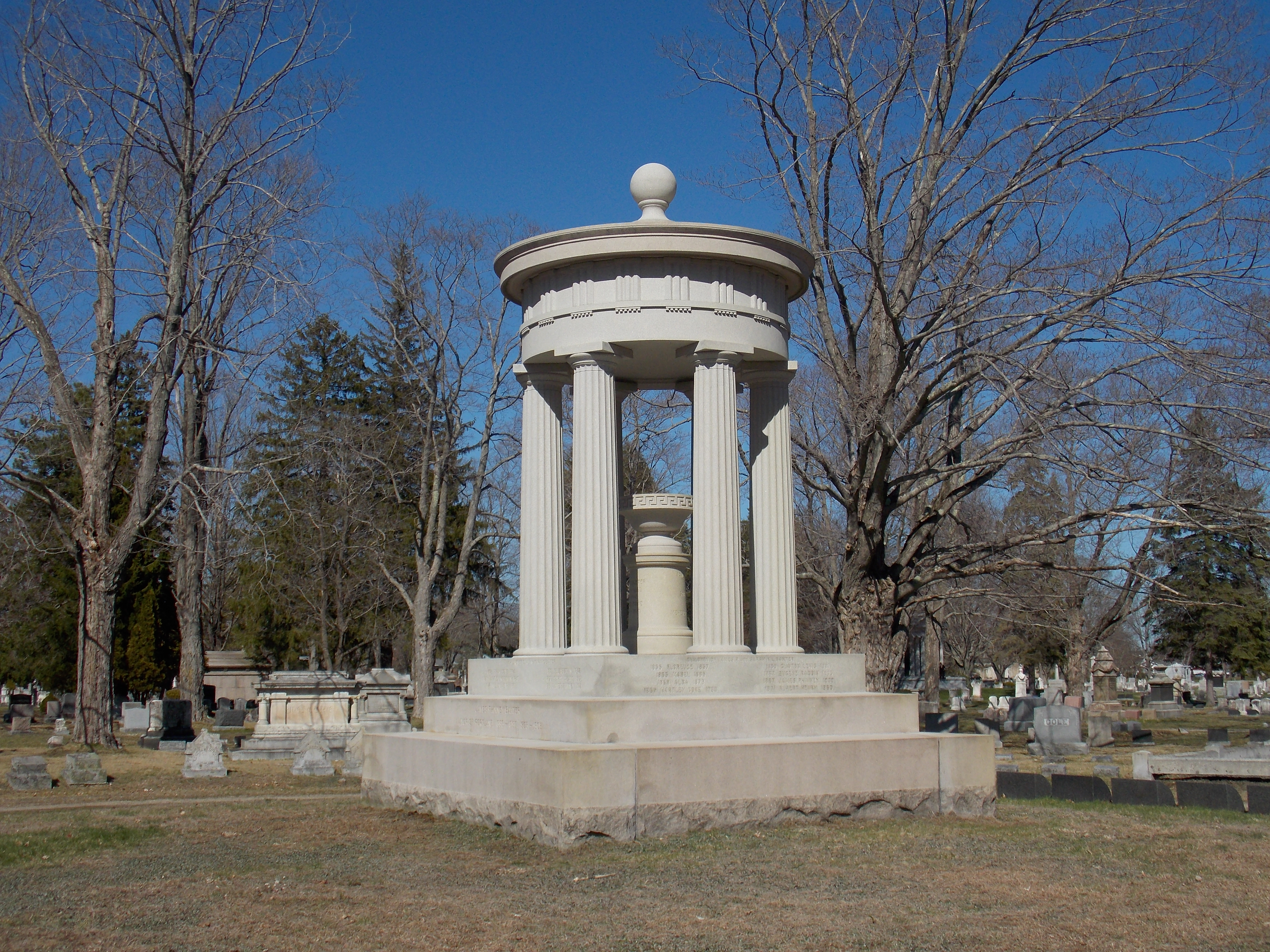
Baxter Family Monument at Evergreen Cemetery

- 1855
  - Portland Rum Riot.
  - Evergreen Cemetery established.
  - United States Marine Hospital established.
- 1856 - Chestnut Street Methodist Church built.
- 1859
  - Forest City Cemetery established.
  - Mechanics' Hall completed.

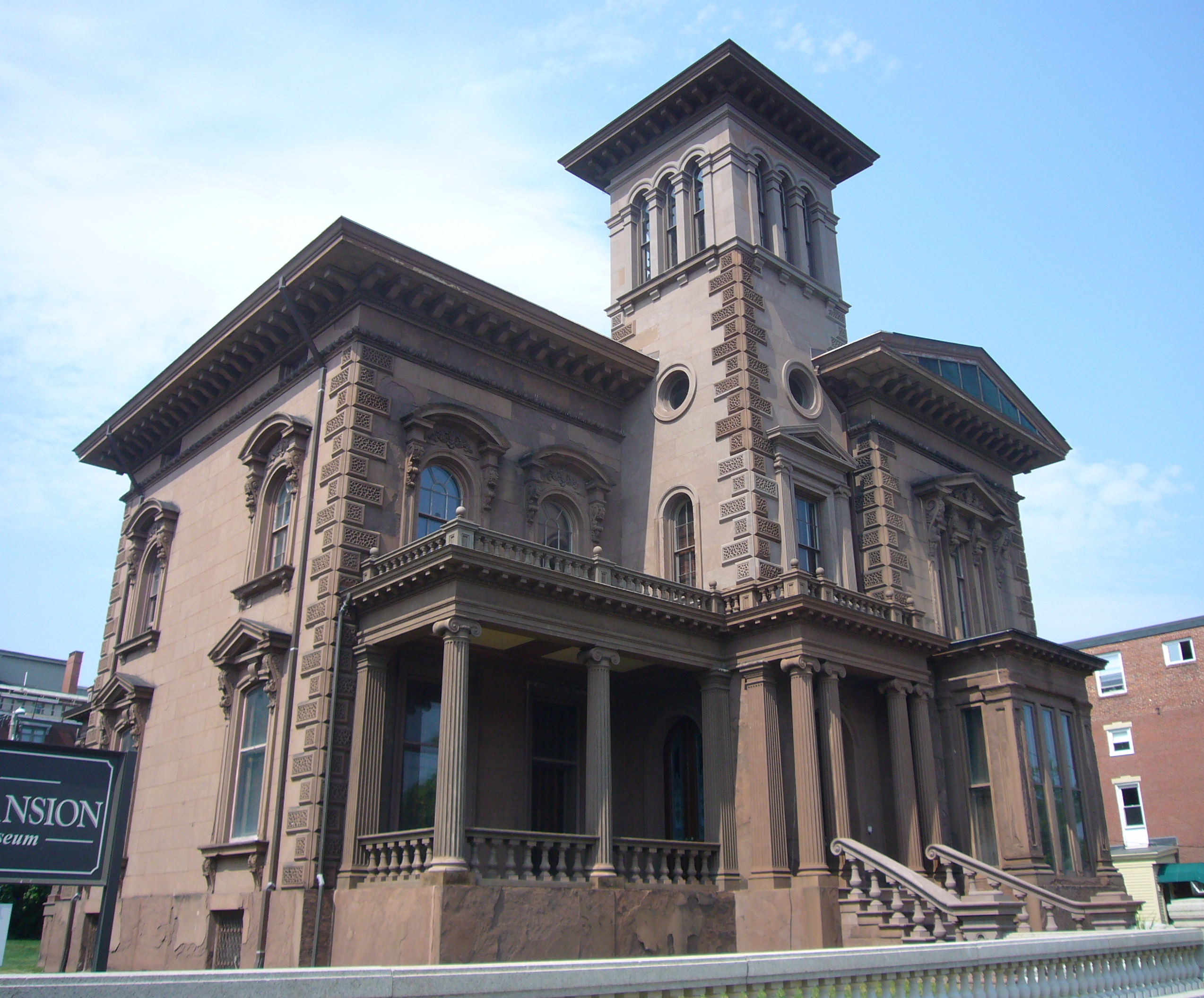
Victoria Mansion

- 1860
  - Victoria Mansion built.
  - Portland Railroad Company established.
- 1862
  - Portland Daily Press newspaper began publication.
  - Maine Central Railroad Company began operations.
  - Second iteration of City Hall built on Congress Street.
  - Portland Water Company established.
- 1863
  - Battle of Portland Harbor.
  - Portland street car service began.
  - Galt wharf grain elevator completed for export of Canadian wheat.

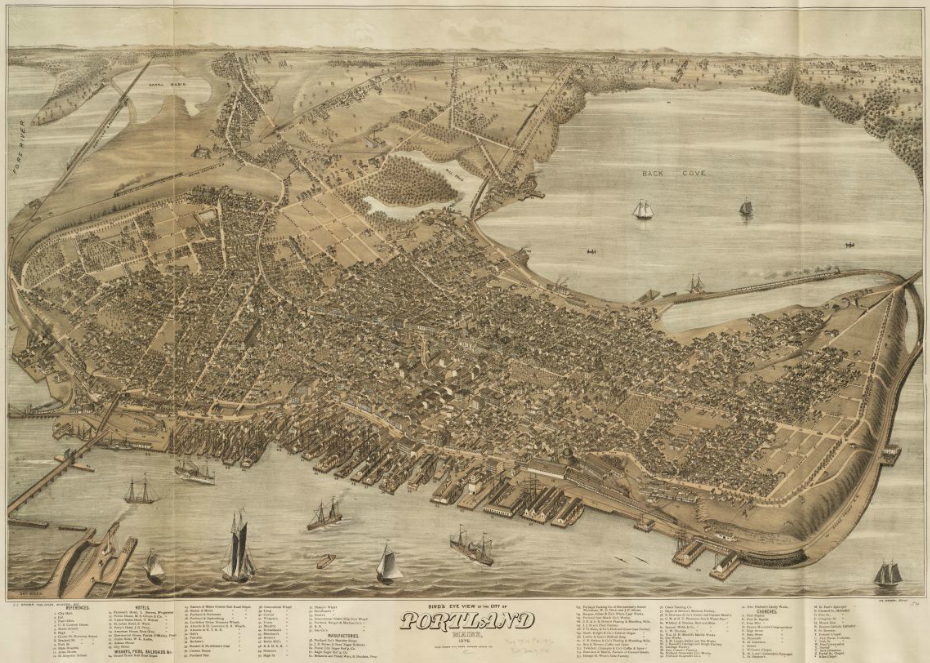
"Bird's Eye View of the City of Portland," 1876

- 1865 - Fort Gorges completed.
- 1866
  - Fire.
  - Lincoln Park established.
- 1867
  - Portland Institute and Public Library founded.
  - First Baptist Church built.
  - Water company established to supply the city from Sebago Lake.
- 1868 - Third City Hall, St. Paul's Church and Rectory and the Falmouth Hotel built.
- 1869
  - Cathedral of the Immaculate Conception construction completed.
  - Portland Yacht Club established.
- 1870 - Cumberland and Oxford Canal abandoned when Portland and Ogdensburg Railroad reached Sebago Lake.
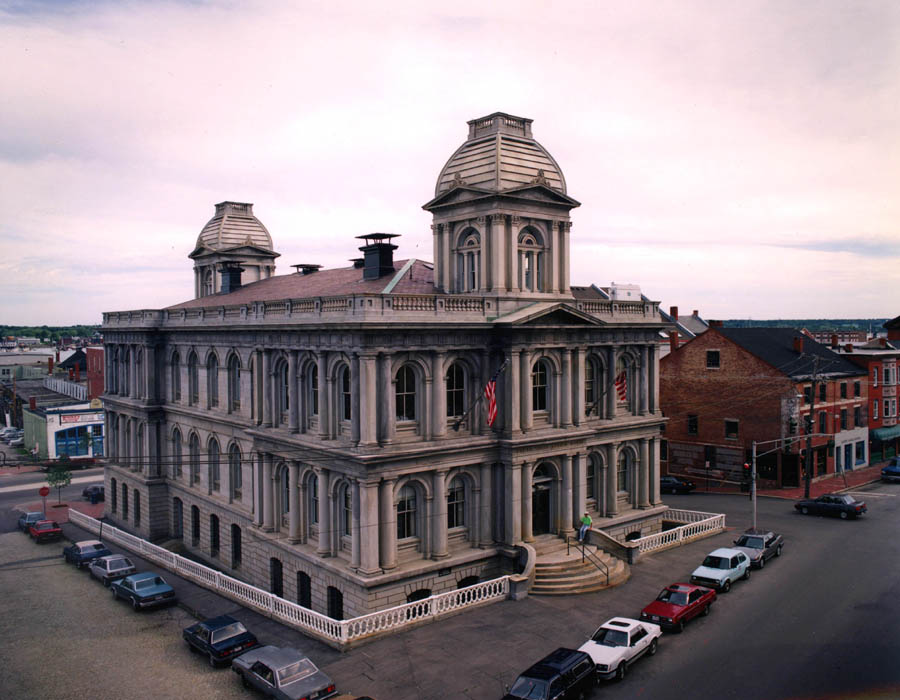
- United States Custom House
  1872 - U.S. Customhouse built.
- 1874
  - Deering High School established.
  - Maine Medical Center established.
- 1875
  - Southworth Press established.
  - The Cumberland Club established.
- 1878 - University of Southern Maine established.
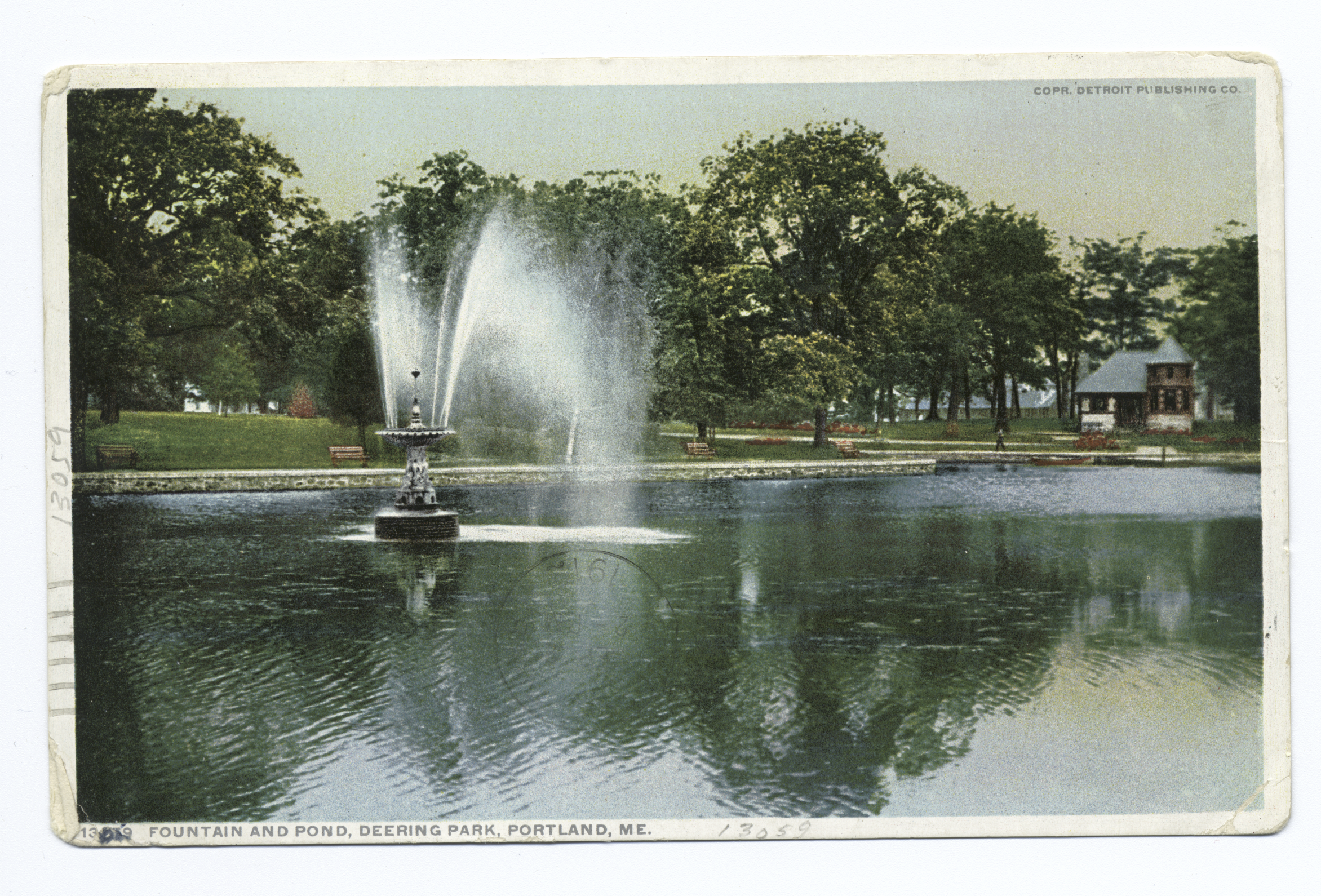
- Deering Oaks Park
  1879 - Deering Oaks Park established.
- 1881 - Young People's Society of Christian Endeavour founded by Francis Edward Clark.
- 1882
  - Portland Society of Art founded.
  - Evening Express newspaper begins publication.
- 1884 - Maine Genealogical Society organized.
- 1886
  - Portland centennial.
  - The Portland Club established.
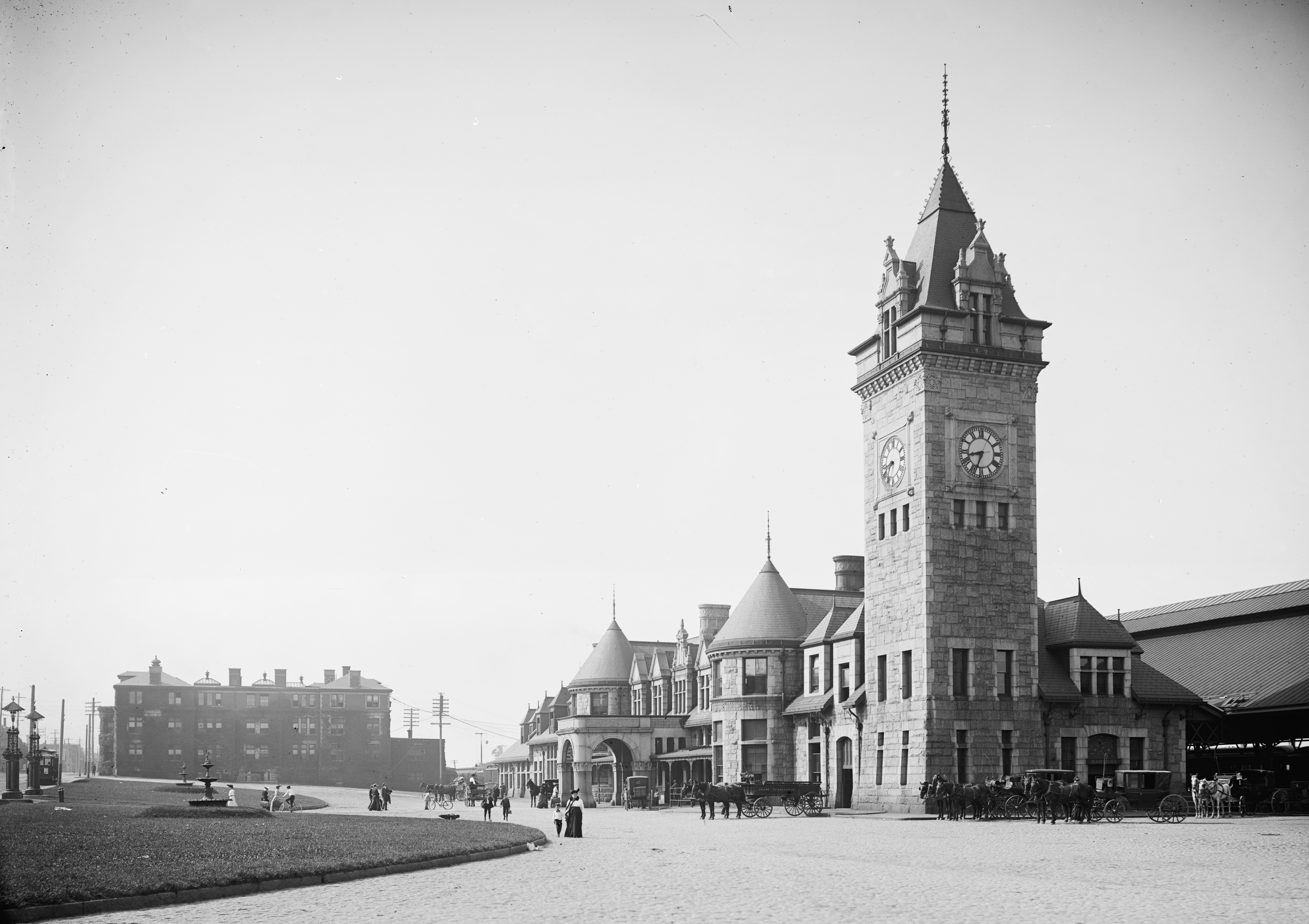
- Union Station
  1888
  - Henry Wadsworth Longfellow Monument unveiled at Longfellow Square in West End.
  - First City Hall demolished.
  - Union Station built.
- 1890 - Population: 36,425.
- 1891
  - Portland Soldiers and Sailors Monument, erected on the site of the first City Hall, dedicated in Monument Square.
  - Maine Eye and Ear Infirmary building completed.
- 1892 - Six Towns Times established.
- 1895 - State of Maine Armory building completed.
- 1897
  - Jefferson Theatre opened.
  - Maine Music Festival began.
  - St. Lawrence Church and Williston-West Church built.
- 1898 - Waynflete School established.
- 1899
  - Deering became part of Portland.
  - Portland Camera Club formed.
- 1900 - Population: 50,145.

== 20th century ==
- 1901 - New England Elevator Company built the largest grain elevator on the Atlantic coast.
- 1902 - First Amato's opened on India Street.
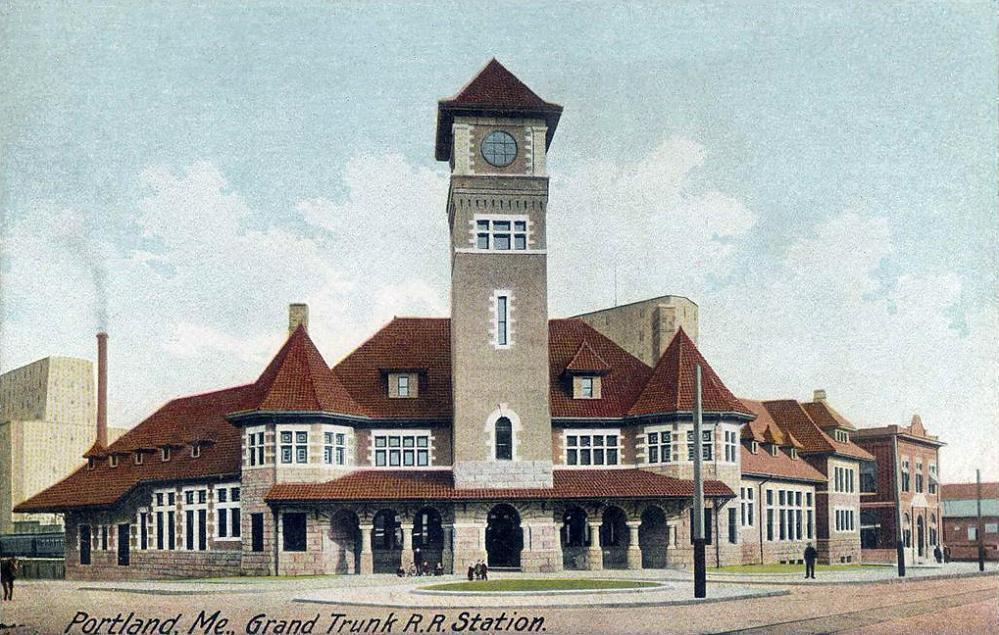
- Grand Trunk Railway Station
  1906
  - Portland Company ceased building railway locomotives.
  - Grand Trunk Railway Station built on India Street.
- 1908
  - Portland Society of Arts and Crafts organized.
  - City Hall destroyed by fire.
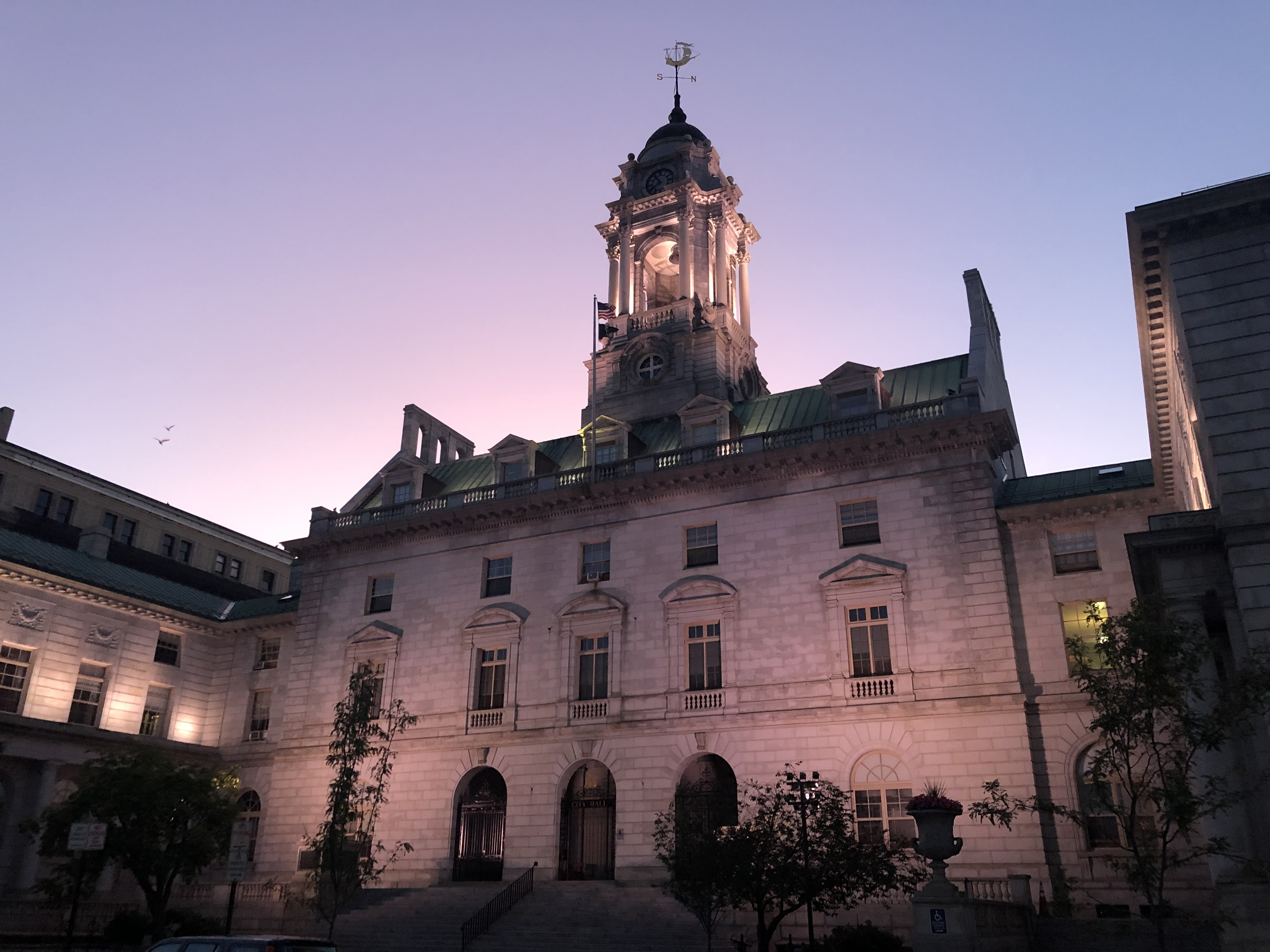
- City Hall
  1909
  - The fourth and current City Hall built.
  - Children's Hospital built at 68 High Street.
- 1910
  - Memorial statue of Thomas Brackett Reed unveiled on the Western Promenade.
  - Cumberland County Courthouse built.
  - Population: 58,571.
- 1911
  - L. D. M. Sweat Memorial Art Museum dedicated.
  - Portland Terminal Company formed.
  - Masonic Temple built.
  - Edward T. Gignoux United States Courthouse built.
- 1912
  - Merrill Auditorium built.
  - Eastern Promenade laid out according to design by Olmsted Brothers.
- 1913
  - State of Maine Express began direct Pullman railway service from major U.S. cities to Portland.
  - A historical pageant took place on Eastern Promenade.
  - B&M Baked Beans factory built.
- 1914
  - Portland–Lewiston Interurban service began between Portland and Lewiston.
  - Green Memorial A.M.E. Zion Church, Portland Exposition Building and Woodfords Club built.
- 1916 - Million Dollar Bridge opened.
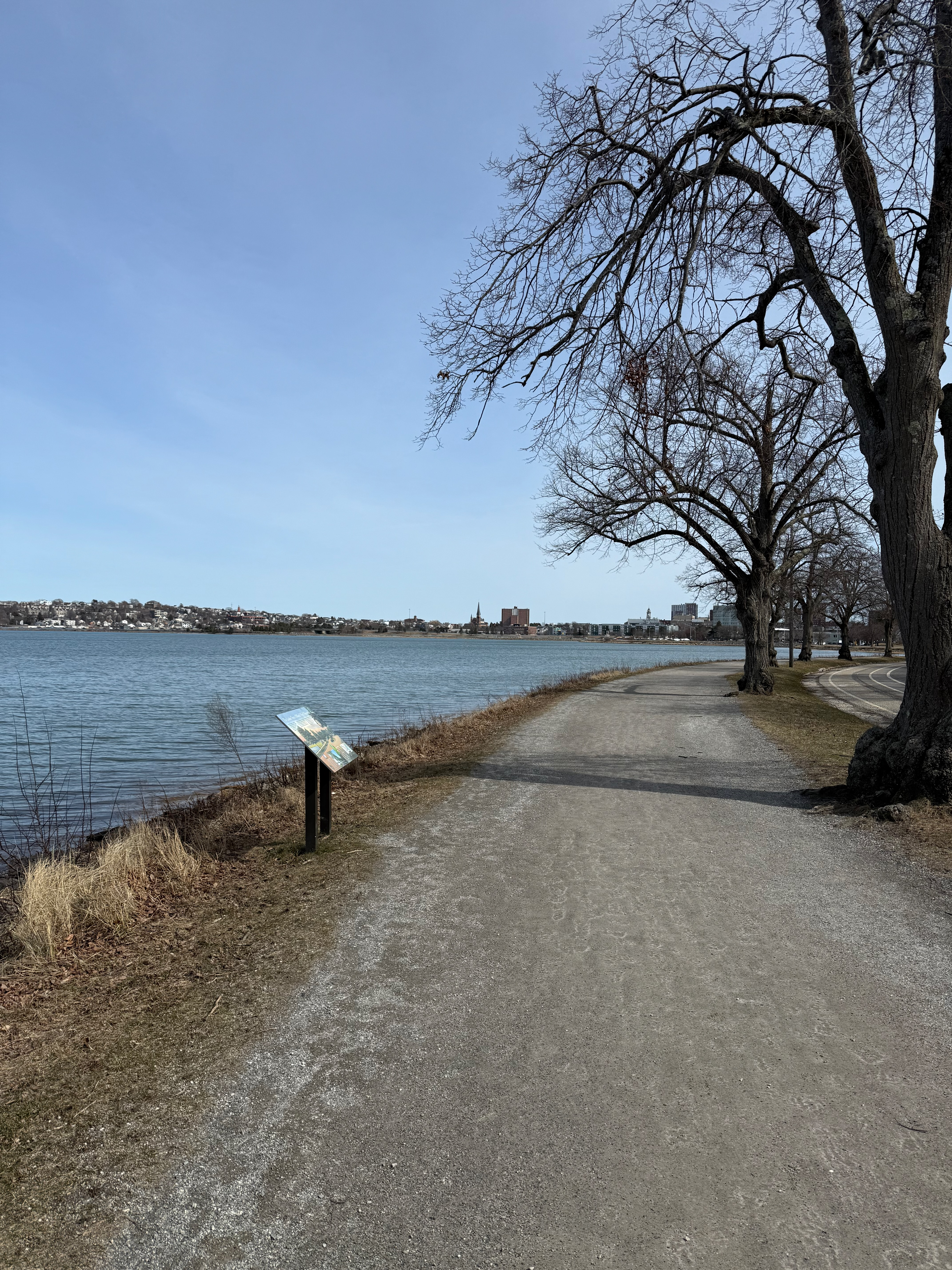
- Baxter Boulevard
  1917
  - Baxter Boulevard established at Back Cove.
  - Cheverus High School established.
  - Oakhurst Dairy established.
- 1919
  - Portland designated eastern end of the Theodore Roosevelt International Highway.
  - Casco Bay Lines established.
- 1921 - Etz Chaim Synagogue built.
- 1923
  - Portland Symphony Orchestra and Children's Theatre of Portland established.
  - Press Herald Building completed.
  - Canadian National Railway began diverting export traffic from Portland to Canadian Maritime ports.
- 1924
  - Maine State Pier and Chapman Building constructed.
  - Longfellow Garden Club organized.
- 1925 - Central Fire Station built on part of Lincoln Park.
- 1926 - U.S. Route 1 linked Portland to the United States highway system.
- 1927 - Eastland Hotel opened.
- 1928 - James E. Barlow hired as second City Manager.
- 1929 - State Theatre opened.
- 1930
  - The Gull began international Pullman train service through Portland from the Maritimes.
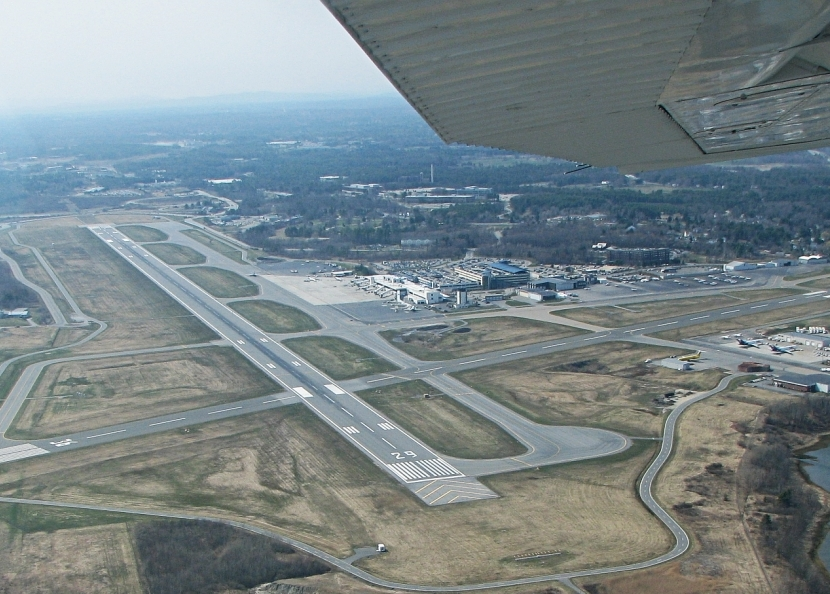
  - Portland International Jetport
    Fitzpatrick Stadium built.
- 1931 - Portland-Westbrook Municipal Airport (later Portland International Jetport) opened.
- 1932 - Main Post Office building completed.
- 1933
  - End of interurban service from Portland to surrounding communities.
- 1934 - Flying Yankee began streamliner service to Portland.
- 1936 - The Village Cafe opened on Newbury Street. It remained in business for 71 years.
- 1940 - East Wind began summer passenger train service to Portland for vacationers from major eastern cities.
- 1941
  - Portland–Montreal Pipe Line completed.
  - Portland became United States Navy destroyer base Sail during the Battle of the Atlantic.
  - Victoria Mansion museum opened.
  - Portland street car system dismantled.
- 1942 - Battery Steele built.
- 1944 - A-26 Invader crashed near Portland airport, Maine's worst aircraft accident.
- 1946 - Baxter Woods municipal forest established.
- 1947 - Maine Turnpike connected Portland to what became the Interstate Highway System.
- 1950 - Population: 77,634.
- 1953 - WCSH begins broadcasting.
- 1954
  - WMTW begins broadcasting.
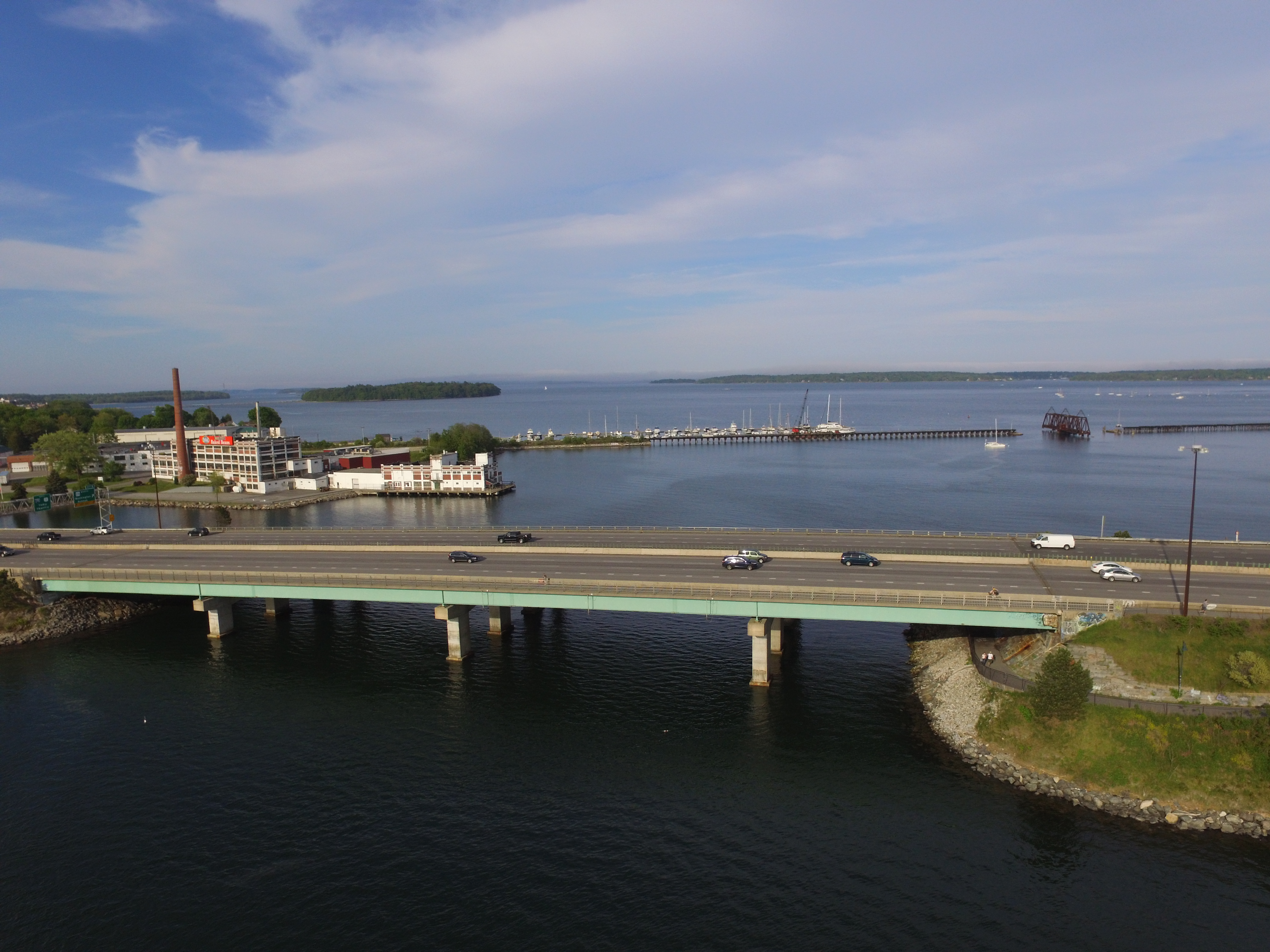
  - Tukey's Bridge
    Original Veterans Memorial Bridge built.
- 1960 - Tukey's Bridge built.
- 1961
  - Demolition of Union Station ended daily passenger train service to Portland.
  - Greyhound bus station built on St. John Street.
- 1963 - Falmouth Hotel demolished.
- 1964 - Greater Portland Landmarks preservation group formed.
- 1965
  - Kennedy Park housing built.
  - United States Hotel demolished in Monument Square.
- 1966
  - Greater Portland Transit District established.
  - Grand Trunk Railway Station demolished.

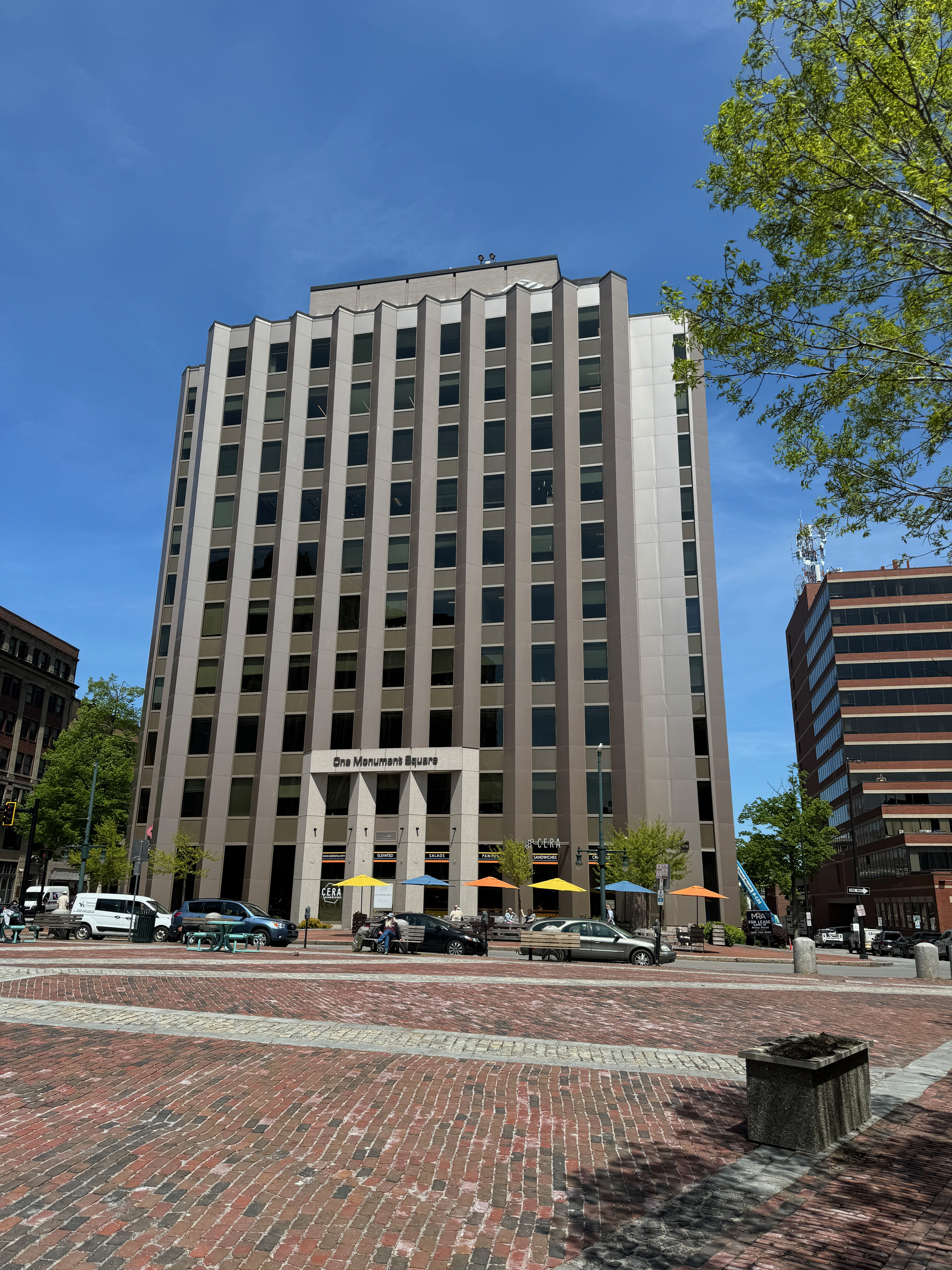
One Monument Square

- 1967
  - Summer weekend passenger train service to Portland ended.
  - Franklin Street demolished, to be replaced by Franklin Arterial.
- 1969
  - One Monument Square opened on the former site of the United States Hotel.
  - Franklin Towers completed, becoming Maine's tallest residential building.
  - Portland Rugby Football Club established.
- 1970 - University of Southern Maine's Portland campus established.
- 1971
  - The Canal Bank Plaza is built on the site of the former Falmouth Hotel.
  - Construction of Interstate 295 through Portland was completed.
- 1973
  - Old Port Festival began.
  - WMPG begins broadcasting.
  - Salt Institute for Documentary Studies founded.
- 1974
  - The Hollow Reed restaurant in the Old Port was founded.
  - Profile Theatre established (later renamed Portland Stage Company).
- 1975 - Portland Pirates ice hockey team established.
- 1976 - Children's Museum of Maine founded.
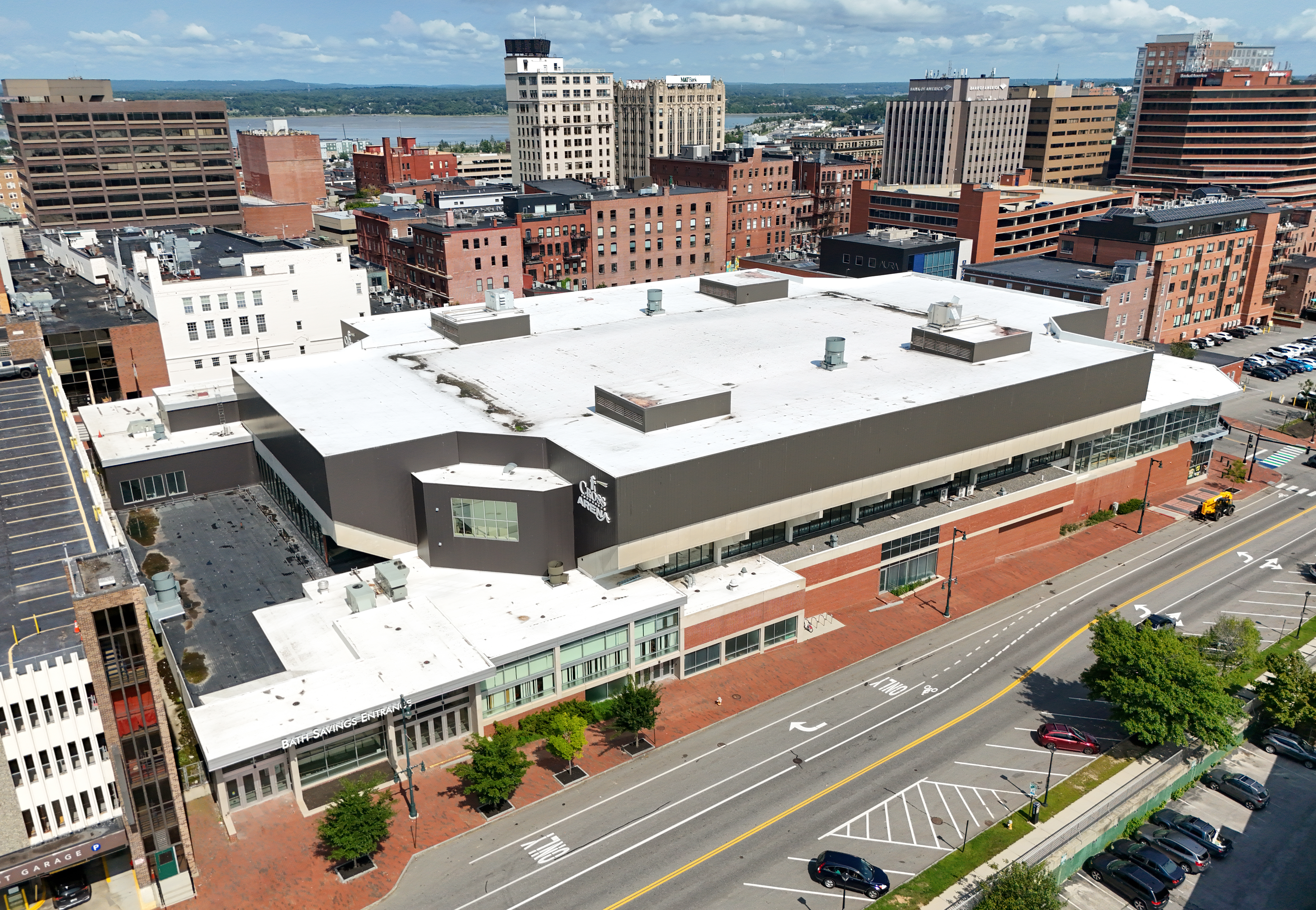
- Cumberland County Civic Center
  1977
  - Cumberland County Civic Center built.
  - American Hockey League iteration of the Maine Mariners ice-hockey team established.
- 1978 - Portland Stage Company active.
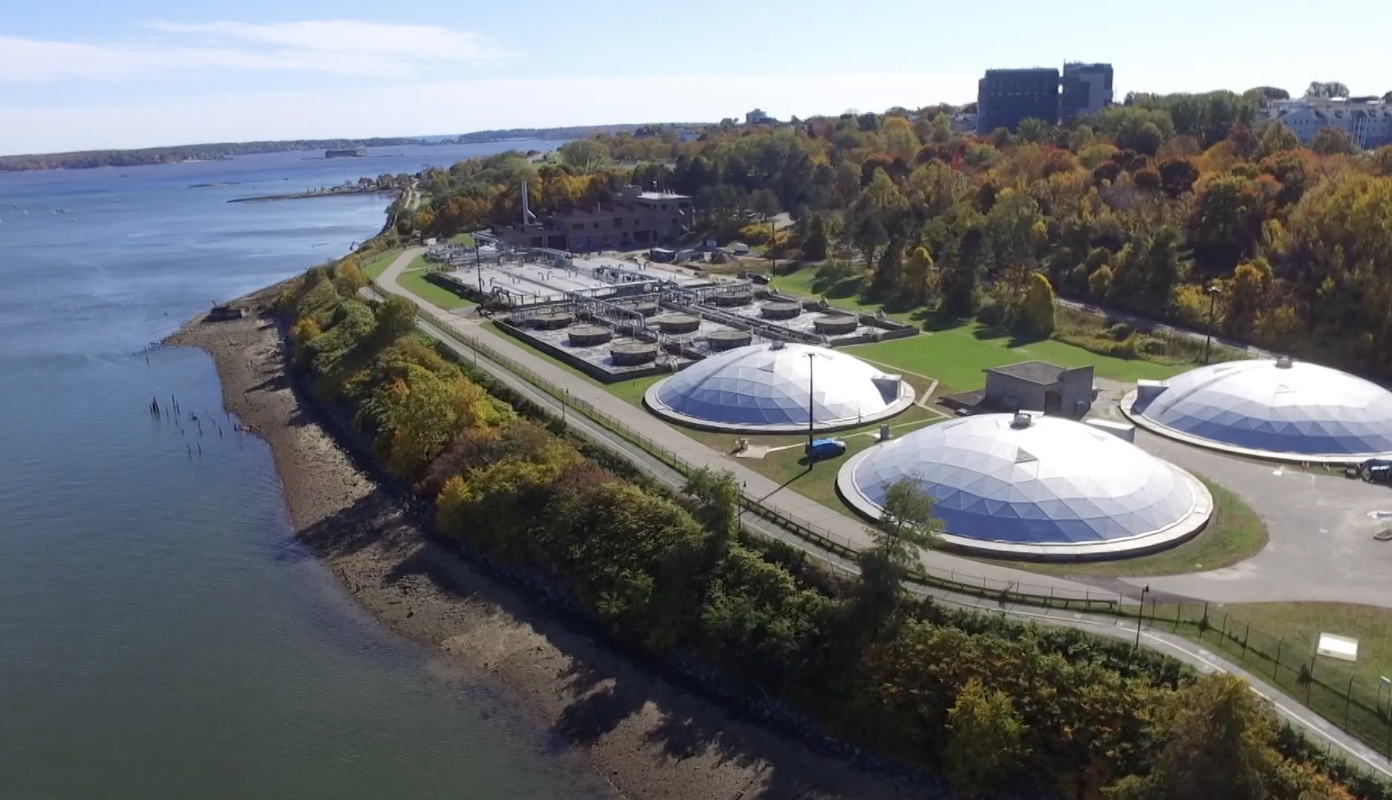
- East End Treatment Plant
  1979 - East End Treatment Plant established.
- 1983 - Portland Museum of Art expanded into the Charles Shipman Payson Building.
- 1984
  - Sister city relationship established with Shinagawa, Tokyo, Japan.
  - Portland Ice Arena opened.
- 1985 - Portland Monthly magazine began publication.
- 1988
  - Maine Island Trail Association established.
  - Gritty McDuff's, considered Maine's first brewpub, opens on Fore Street.
- 1989 - East Coast Hockey League iteration of the Maine Mariners ice-hockey team established.
- 1992 - AHL Maine Mariners became defunct.
- 1993
  - Portland Pirates ice hockey team formed.
  - Maine Narrow Gauge Railroad Museum opened.
  - Children's Museum moved to its third home, beside the Portland Museum of Art on Free Street.
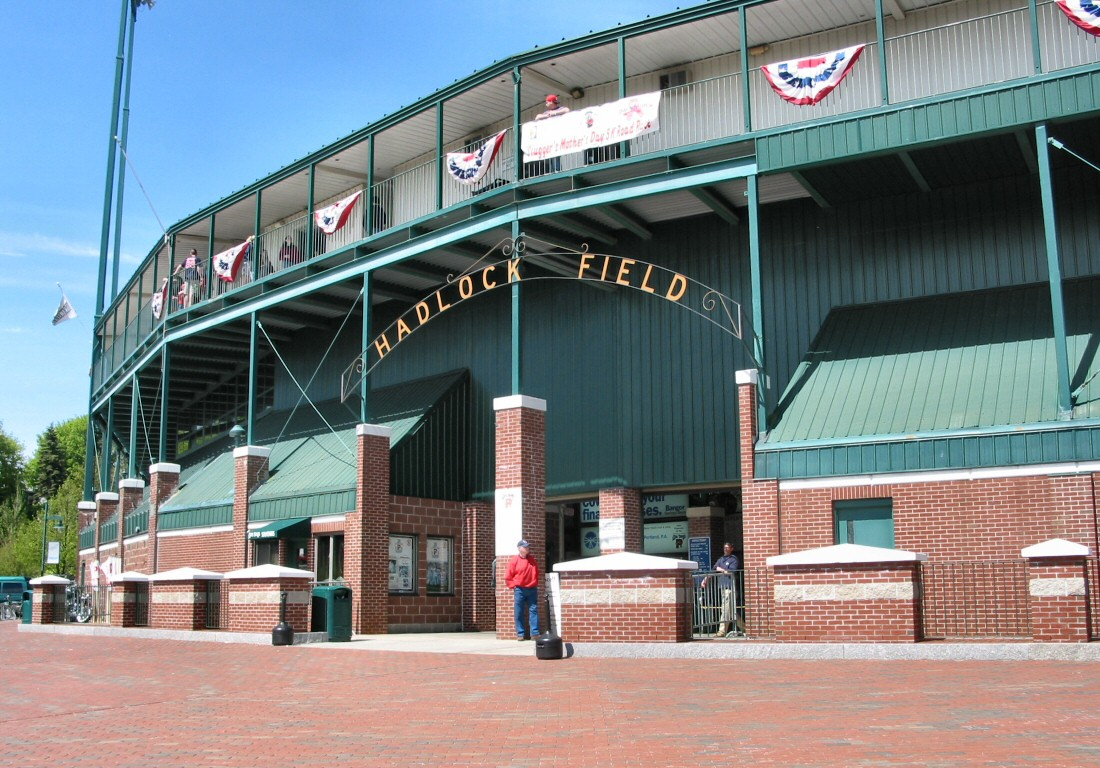
- Hadlock Field
  1994
  - Portland Chamber Music Festival began.
  - PORTopera founded.
  - Portland Sea Dogs minor-league baseball team established; Hadlock Field opened.
  - Cumberland County Jail built.
- 1996
  - Westbrook College merged with the University of New England, later assuming the name of the latter.
  - Portland bus terminal opened at Thompson's Point.
- 1997
  - Casco Bay Bridge opens.
  - City website went online (approximate date).

== 21st century ==
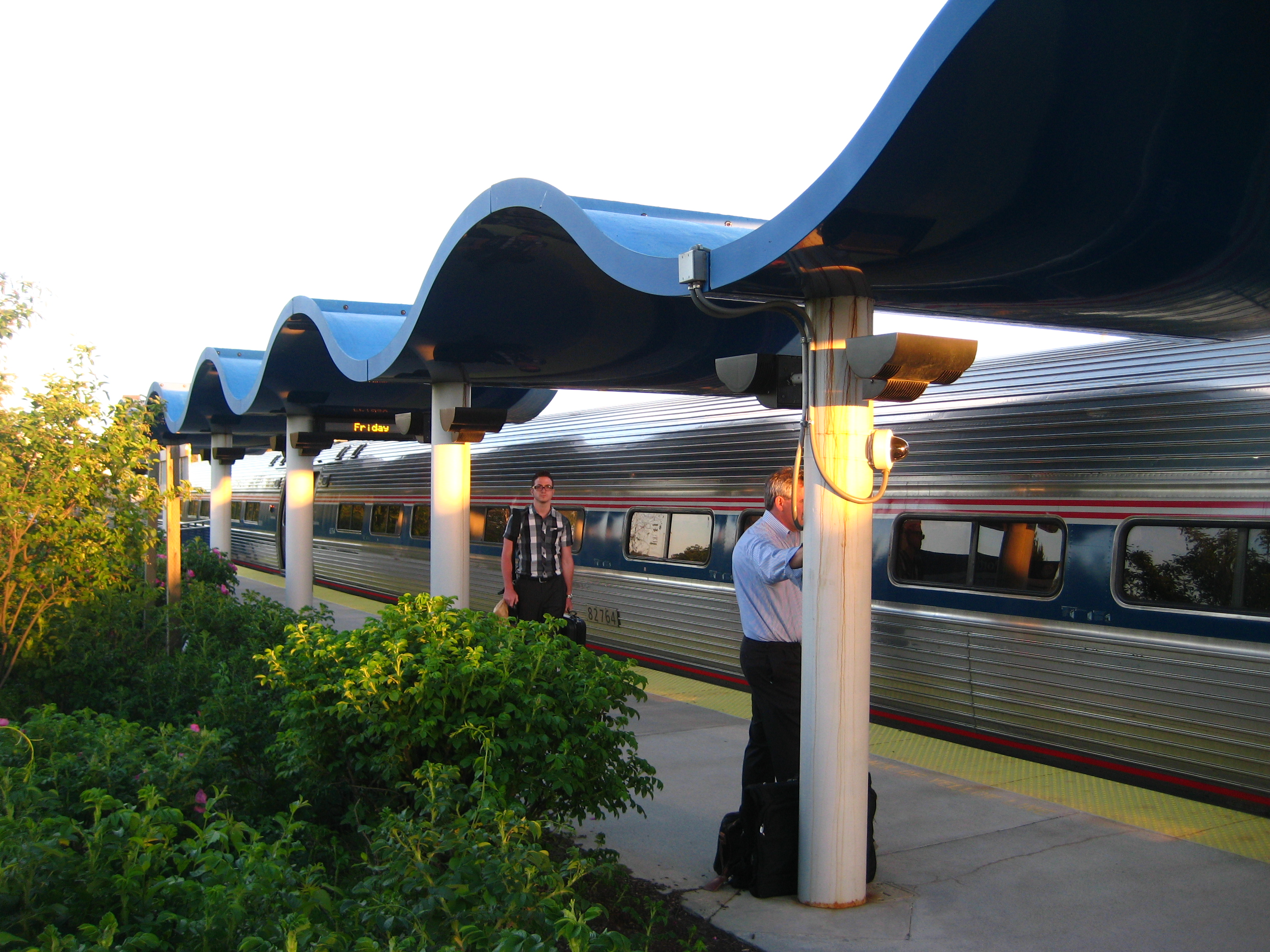
Downeaster at Portland Transportation Center

- 2000 - First Friday Art Walk established.
- 2001
  - Portland Transportation Center completed, incorporating a train station beside the bus station.
  - Downeaster restored passenger train service to Portland.
- 2003 - Sister city relationship established with Mytilene, Greece.
- 2006 - Maine Roller Derby and Portland Society of Architects founded.
- 2008 - Ocean Gateway International Marine Passenger Terminal opened.
- 2009
  - Port City Music Hall opened.
  - Congress Street designated an historic district.
  - Maine Celtics basketball team established.
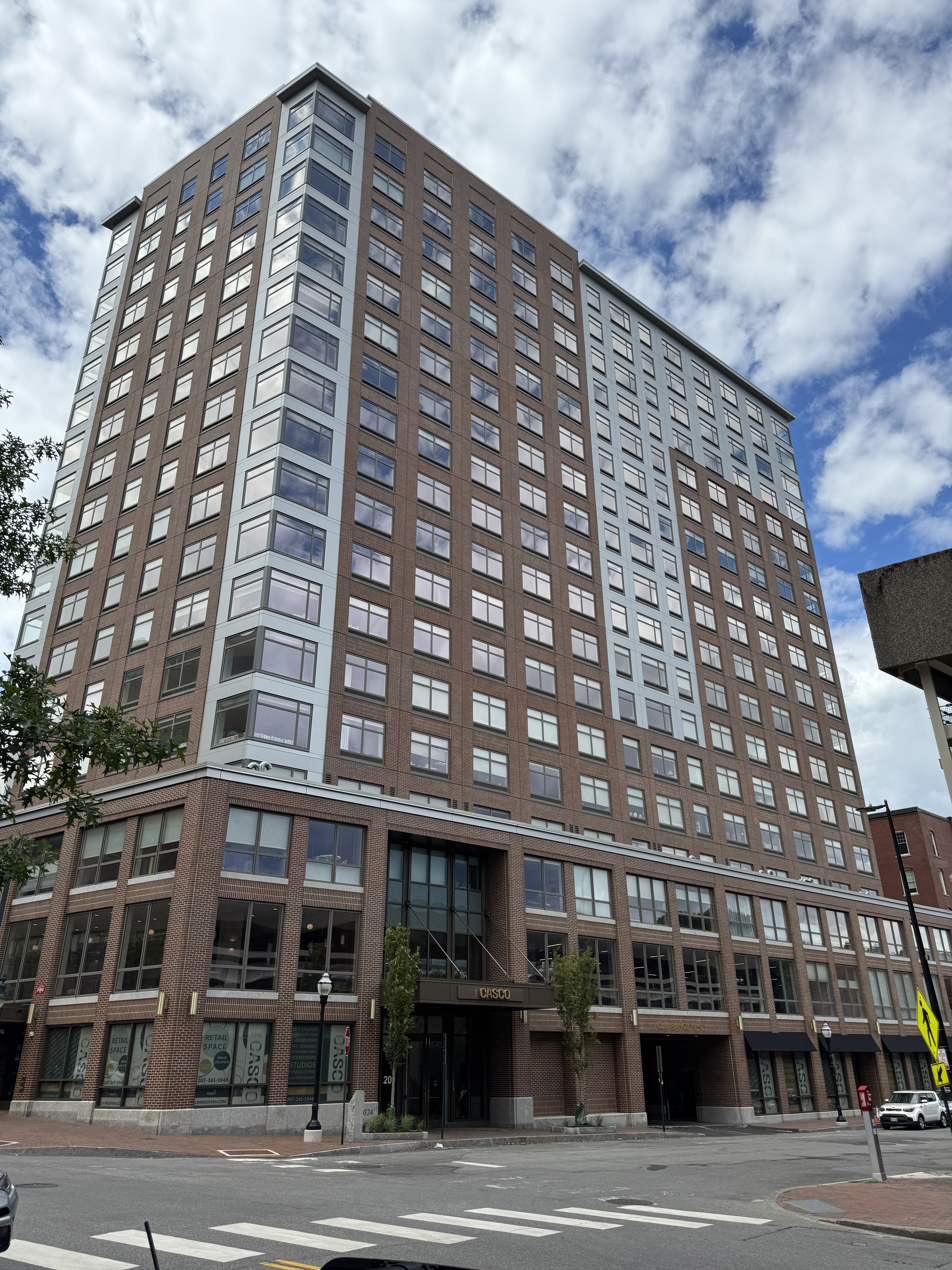
    201 Federal Street
- 2010
  - State Theatre reopened.
  - Population: 66,194 city; 514,098 metro.
- New Veterans Memorial Bridge completed.
- 2014 - The fourth and current iteration of the Martin's Point Bridge is completed.
- 2016
  - Portland Pirates ice hockey team became defunct.
  - First departure from International Marine Terminal.
- 2021- Children's Museum & Theatre of Maine opened at Thompson's Point.
- 2023
  - Portland Hearts of Pine soccer team established.
  - 201 Federal Street completed, surpassed Franklin Towers as Maine's tallest residential building.
- 2024 - Record tide level of the Fore River causes severe flooding.

== See also ==
- History of Portland, Maine
- Neighborhoods in Portland, Maine
- List of mayors of Portland, Maine
- National Register of Historic Places listings in Portland, Maine
- Railroad history of Portland, Maine
- List of Portland, Maine schools

== Bibliography ==
Published in the 19th century

- Nathaniel G. Jewett (1823). Portland Directory & Register. Todd and Smith, printer.
- S.B. Beckett (1850). Portland Directory. Thurston & Co., printer.
- "Portland, Me.", Phelps' Hundred Cities and Large Towns of America, New York: Phelps, Fanning & Co., 1853, OCLC 2503582
- S.B. Beckett (1856). Portland Directory. Brown Thurston, printer.
- Joseph H. Bragdon (1857), "Portland", Seaboard towns: or, Traveller's guide book from Boston to Portland, Newburyport, Mass.: Moulton & Clark, OCLC 3443773
- S.B. Beckett (1858), Portland Directory, Brown Thurston Printing, OL 23414268M
- Guide book for Portland and vicinity, Portland, Me.: B. Thurston and J. F. Richardson, 1859, OCLC 29977128, OL 6904686M
- William Willis. The history of Portland, from 1632 to 1864, 2nd ed. Portland: Bailey & Noyes, 1865
- John Neal (1874), Portland illustrated, Portland, Me: W. S. Jones, OCLC 7153525, OL 6904688M
- Edward H. Elwell (1876), Portland and Vicinity, Portland, Me: Loring, Short, & Harmon, and W.S. Jones, OCLC 332651, OL 7146626M
- "Portland and its environs", New England: a handbook for travelers (7th ed.), Boston, Mass: James R. Osgood, 1880
- Charter and Ordinances of the City of Portland, Portland: Dresser, McLellan & Company, 1881, OL 7125811M
- Joseph Sabin, ed. (1885). "Portland, Maine". Bibliotheca Americana. Vol. 15. New York: Joseph Sabin. OCLC 13972268.
- "Portland (Maine)" . Encyclopædia Britannica. Vol. 19 (9th ed.). 1885. p. 528.
- J.T. Hull, ed. (1886), Centennial celebration: an account of the municipal celebration of the one hundredth anniversary of the incorporation of the town of Portland, July 4th, 5th and 6th, 1886, Portland: Printed by Owen, Strout & company, OCLC 7566292, OL 6981201M
- "City of Portland". Maine Register, or State Year-book and Legislative Manual. Portland, ME: J.B. Gregory. 1887.
- "City of Portland". Maine register or state year-book and legislative manual. Portland, ME: G.M. Donham. 1891.
- George F. Bacon (1891), Portland: its representative business men and its points of interest, Newark, N.J: Glenwood Publishing Company, OCLC 8015123, OL 6904683M
- Charles Bancroft Gillespie (1899), Portland past and present (Souvenir ed.), Portland, Me: Evening Express Publishing Co., OCLC 5630912, OL 177491M

Published in the 20th century

- "Portland (Maine)" . Encyclopædia Britannica. Vol. 22 (11th ed.). 1910. p. 120.
- Directory of Portland, Portland Directory Co., 1912, OL 22890122M
- "Portland", Handbook of New England, Boston: Porter E. Sargent, 1916, OCLC 16726464
- Federal Writers' Project (1940), Portland City Guide, American Guide Series, Portland: Forest City Printing Company, OCLC 2291042, OL 7063149M
- Robertson, Edwin B. (1982). Remember the Portland, Maine, Trolleys. Robertson Books.
