= Maine Central Railroad General Office Building =

- U.S. National Register of Historic Places
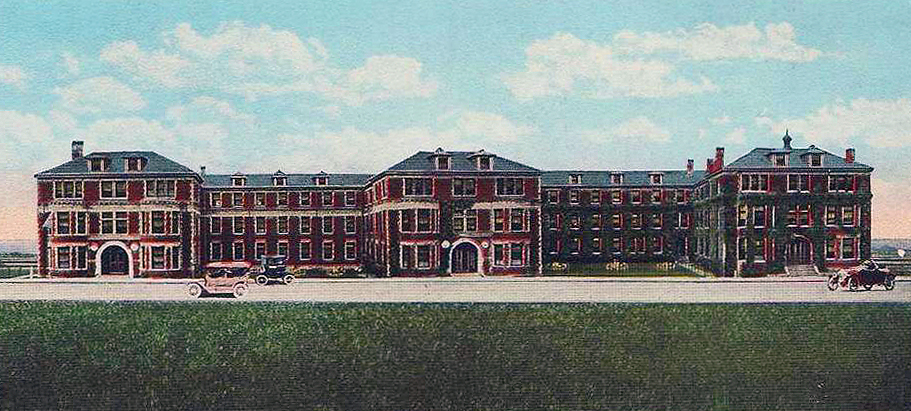
- c. 1920 postcard view

- Location within Maine Location within the United States
- Location: 222-242 Saint John Street, Portland, Maine
- Coordinates: 43°39′03″N 70°16′48″W
- Area: 5.2 acres (2.1 ha)
- Built: 1889, 1898, 1902, 1916
- Architect: Bradlee, Winslow & Wetherill
- Architectural style: Romanesque
- NRHP reference No.: 87002192
- Added to NRHP: January 7, 1988

The former Maine Central Railroad General Office Building is an historic office building at 222-242 Saint John Street in the Saint John Valley neighborhood of Portland, Maine. Built in stages between 1889 and 1916, it was home to the Maine Central Railroad Company, the state's largest railroad operator. It is also one of the city's largest office buildings, and a fine example of Romanesque Revival architecture. It was listed on the National Register of Historic Places in 1988.

== Description and history ==
The former Maine Central Railroad General Office Building is located on the west side of the Portland peninsula, below the Western Promenade between Saint John Street to the east and the railroad tracks to the west. It was located adjacent to Portland's Union Station, which was demolished in 1961. The office building is a large E-shaped three story masonry building, presenting the legs of the E toward Saint John Street and its spine to the railroad tracks. Due to the sloping lot, the track side of the building presents four stories. The street-facing front ends of the building are essentially the same, each with round-arched entrances at the center, flanked by projecting round bays that are two stories in height. A modillioned granite belt course separates the second and third floors, with the third floor having eight sash windows grouped 3-2-3. The building is capped by a hip roof, with dormers at the ends of the E legs as well as along the street-facing sides of the connecting sections, which are seven bays in width.

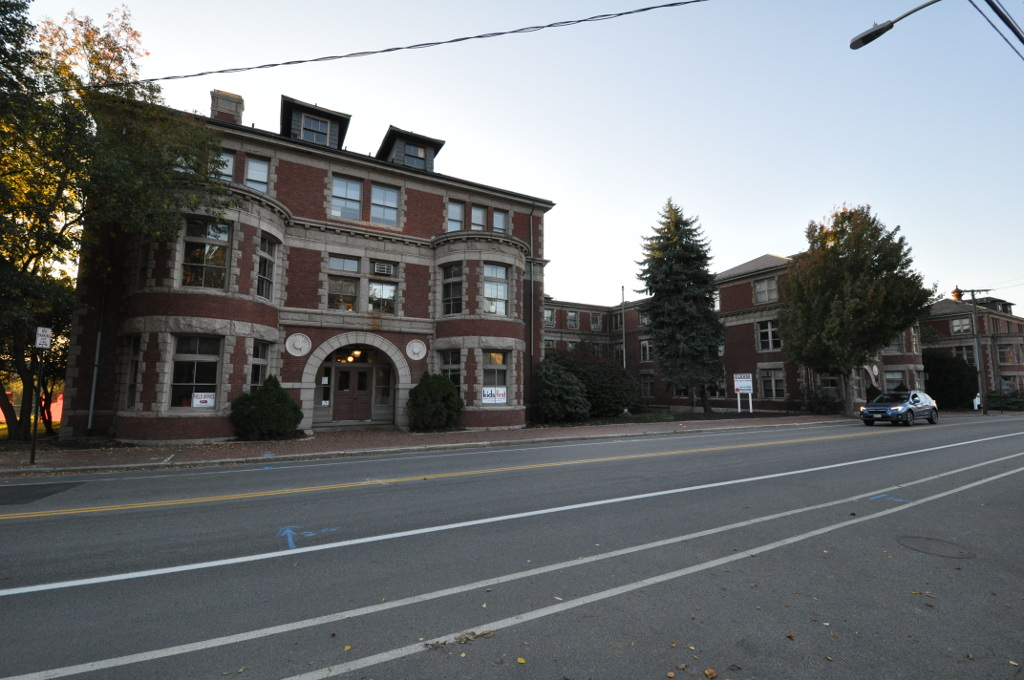
Southern end of the building, 2018

The Maine Central Railroad Company was chartered in 1856 and began operations in 1862, combining the operations of several smaller railroads, Over the next half-century the company grew significantly, through expansion and acquisition. This building was its second headquarters. The oldest portion, the lower two stories of one of the E's legs, was built in 1889 to a design by the Boston architectural firm Bradlee, Winslow & Wetherill. The same firm had also recently designed Union Station, and was retained for each of the building's enlargements. In 1892 it was extended to the rear, and in 1898 the third floor was added. In 1906 a connector and second leg were built, giving the building a U shape, and it achieved its present form in 1916 with the addition of the third leg.

== See also ==
- Railroad history of Portland, Maine
- National Register of Historic Places listings in Portland, Maine
