= Cassidy Point =

- Promontory
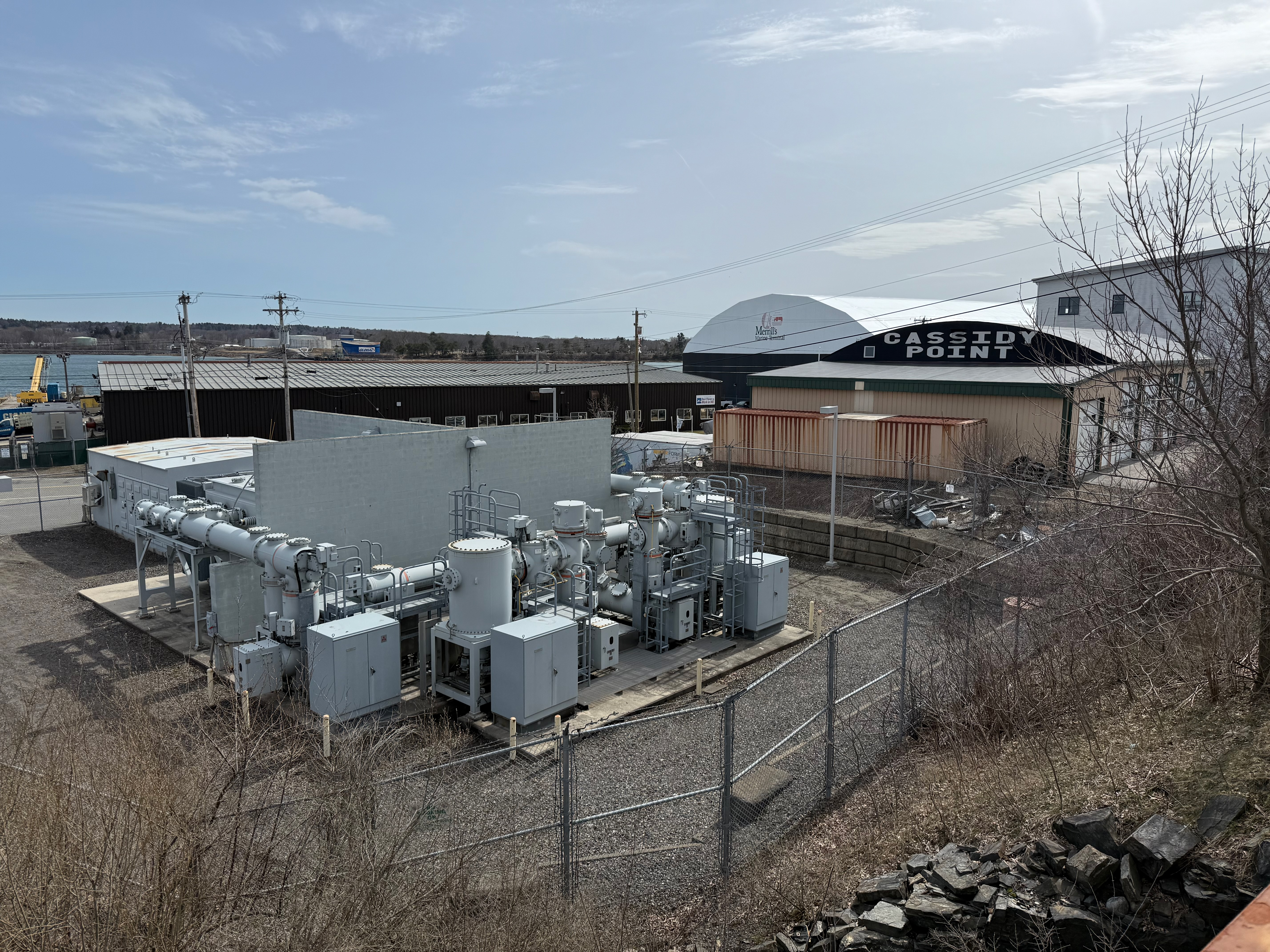
- Industrial buildings at Cassidy Point, looking south to South Portland
- Interactive map of Cassidy Point
- Coordinates: 43.6417468°N 70.2799043°W
- Country: United States
- State: Maine
- County: Cumberland
- City: Portland
- Time zone: UTC-5 (Eastern (EST))
  - Summer (DST): UTC-4 (EDT)

Cassidy Point is a promontory in Portland, Maine, United States. It is located at the south-western end of Portland's peninsula, at the end of Commercial Street, adjacent to the Veterans Memorial Bridge. It overlooks the Fore River estuary. Cassidy Hill stands above it to the north. Both the point and the hill are named for Philip Cassidy (1801–1874), a 19th-century Irish immigrant to Portland.

The point is home to several business, including Sprague Energy. It leased the terminal in 2004, then purchased it in 2017. It is served by Pan Am Railways and by ships delivering coal to its Merrill's Marine Terminal.

In 2020, a studio complex for artists, named Cassidy Point, opened there.

Centered on Cassidy Point is a triangular diverging point of the former Boston and Maine Railroad line and the Mountain Division branch of the former Maine Central Railroad, the latter now owned by CSX Corporation and used by Amtrak's Downeaster passenger trains going to and coming from the Portland Transportation Center at nearby Thompson's Point.

In 2026, Portland's professional soccer team, Portland Hearts of Pine, announced that they had purchased land on Cassidy Point with the intention of building a stadium for both the men's and women's team. The club estimated that it would cost $50 million to build, and projected that the stadium would be ready for the 2029 season.
