= Libbytown =

Neighborhood in Portland, Maine, U.S.

- Neighborhood in Portland, Maine
- Interactive map of Libbytown
- Coordinates: 43.654033°N 70.284836°W
- State: Maine
- County: Cumberland
- City: Portland

Libbytown is a neighborhood in Portland, Maine, United States. One of the oldest neighborhoods in the city, it is located between the Stroudwater, Rosemont, Oakdale, and Parkside neighborhoods, and is separated from the city of South Portland by the Fore River. It extends to the intersection of Stevens Avenue and Congress Street.

It was originally settled by Irish Catholic immigrants. Described as cohesive, it began to decline following the 1961 demolition of Union Station on St. John Street. Around the same time, the neighborhood was divided by the construction of Interstate 295 and the cloverleaf interchange which comprise exit 5.

A long-standing Denny's restaurant occupied an area formerly known as Libby's Corner, between Park Avenue to the north and Congress Street to the south. It closed in 2022, and was purchased by the Maine Department of Transportation (MaineDOT). It was demolished in March 2024. MaineDOT plans to construct a roundabout in an attempt to reconnect the neighborhood over sixty years after the division. Park Avenue and Congress Street would return to being two-way streets. The project was given a $22.4 million federal grant as part of the U.S. Department of Transportation's Reconnecting Communities and Neighborhoods Program.

Maine's busiest public transit hub, the Portland Transportation Center, is in Libbytown. Tony's Donuts, a donut shop on Bolton Street, was established in the neighborhood in 1965.

== Etymology ==
Libbytown is named after tavern keeper George Libby and his descendants, who immigrated from Ireland in the early 1800s and set up three businesses between Park Avenue and outer Congress Street.

== See also ==
- Portland Railroad Company
