= Portland Transportation Center =

Bus and train station in Maine, United States

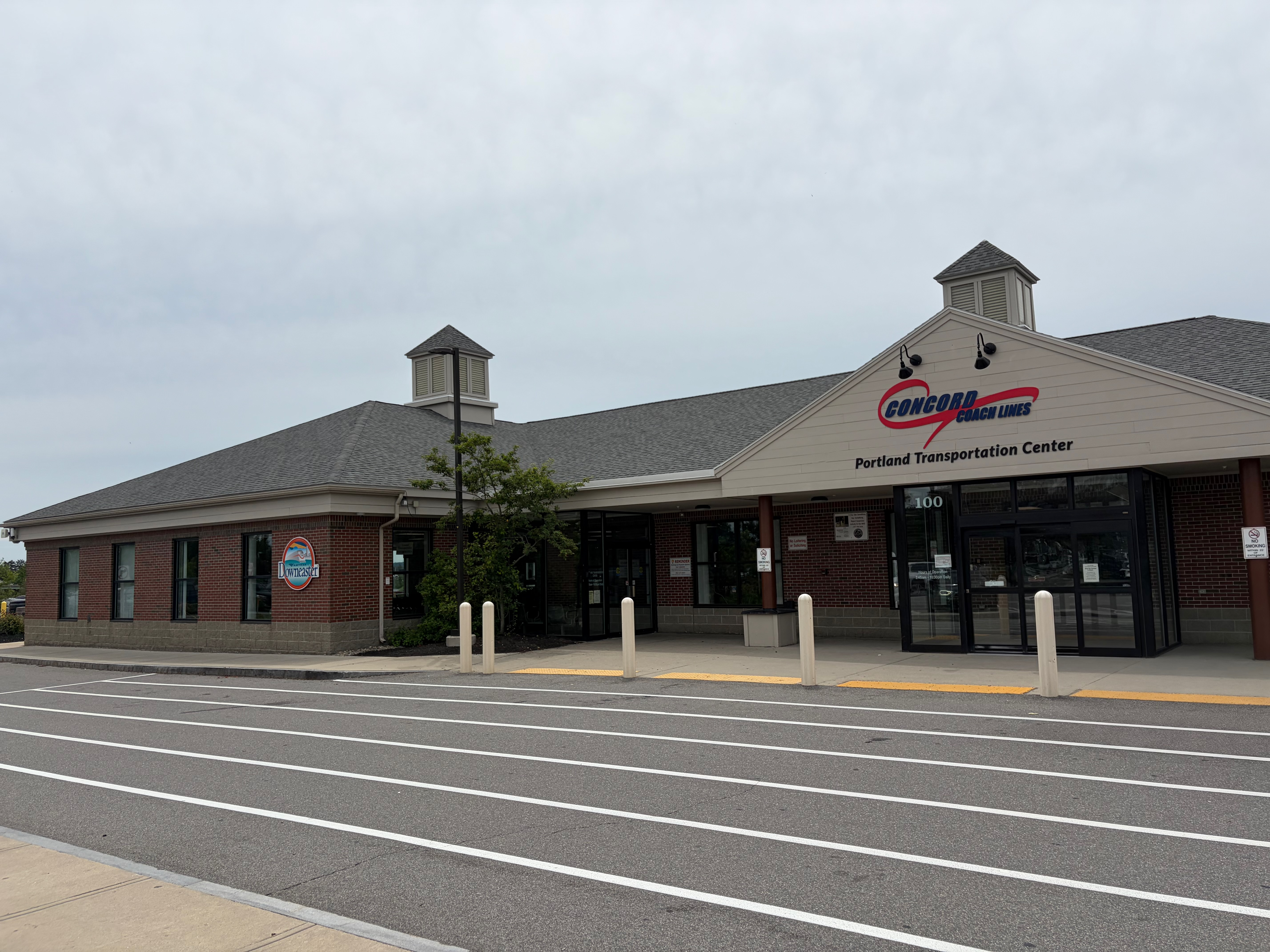
- Pictured in 2026

General information
- Location: 100 Thompson's Point Road; Portland, Maine; United States
- Coordinates: 43°39′13″N 70°17′28″W
- Owner: Concord Coach Lines
- Line: PAR Mountain Branch
- Platforms: 1 side platform
- Tracks: 2 (excluding storage tracks)
- Connections: Concord Coach Lines; Greater Portland Metro Bus: 1, BREEZ

Construction
- Cycle facilities: Yes
- Accessible: Yes

Other information
- Station code: Amtrak: POR

History
- Opened: 1996 (bus station)
- Rebuilt: 2001 (train station)

Passengers
- FY 2025: 167,342 (Amtrak)

Services
Preceding station	Amtrak	Following station
Old Orchard Beach toward Boston North	Downeaster	Freeport toward Brunswick
Location

Portland Transportation Center is a bus and train station in Portland, Maine, United States, served and run primarily by Concord Coach Lines (18 round-trips a day) and Amtrak Downeaster passenger trains (five round-trips a day). It is also served by Megabus (via Concord Coach Lines), as well as the Greater Portland Metro route 1 and BREEZ bus services. The station is open daily from 2:45 AM to 10:30 PM.

Portland Transportation Center is located in Portland's Libbytown neighborhood, about a half mile west of the former site of Portland Union Station and adjacent to Thompson's Point.

Located next to Pan Am Railways' Mountain Branch, formerly the Mountain Division of the Maine Central Railroad, in 2019 the NNERPA Board (which governs the Downeaster service) supported a proposal to relocate the station to the mainline to avoid time-consuming backup moves. A two-year study by the Maine Department of Transportation endorsed moving Amtrak service from this station to a location near Portland's original Union Station, on St. John Street. A 2024 Amtrak study identified three potential locations: between Congress Street and Park Avenue, the Union Station site, and near Mercy Hospital south of the Mountain Branch junction.

A federal grant of $48 million was awarded for construction of a relocated station in August 2026, at the site near Mercy Hospital on St. John Street. Portland city officials, including mayor Mark Dion, have expressed concern about the accessibility of the site, but feel it is inevitable that it will be located there. Building on the former site of Union Station would require that Cumberland County and MaineHealth sell property for such a project, and both have declined to. The Congress Street site is no longer being considered. What will happen to the Concord Coach Lines portion of the current station is unclear. One concern about the St. John Street site is that it may interfere with plans to build a stadium for the Portland Hearts of Pine at nearby Cassidy Point.

== See also ==
- Public transportation in Maine
