= Metro Breez =

Bus route in Southern Maine, United States

Metro BREEZ

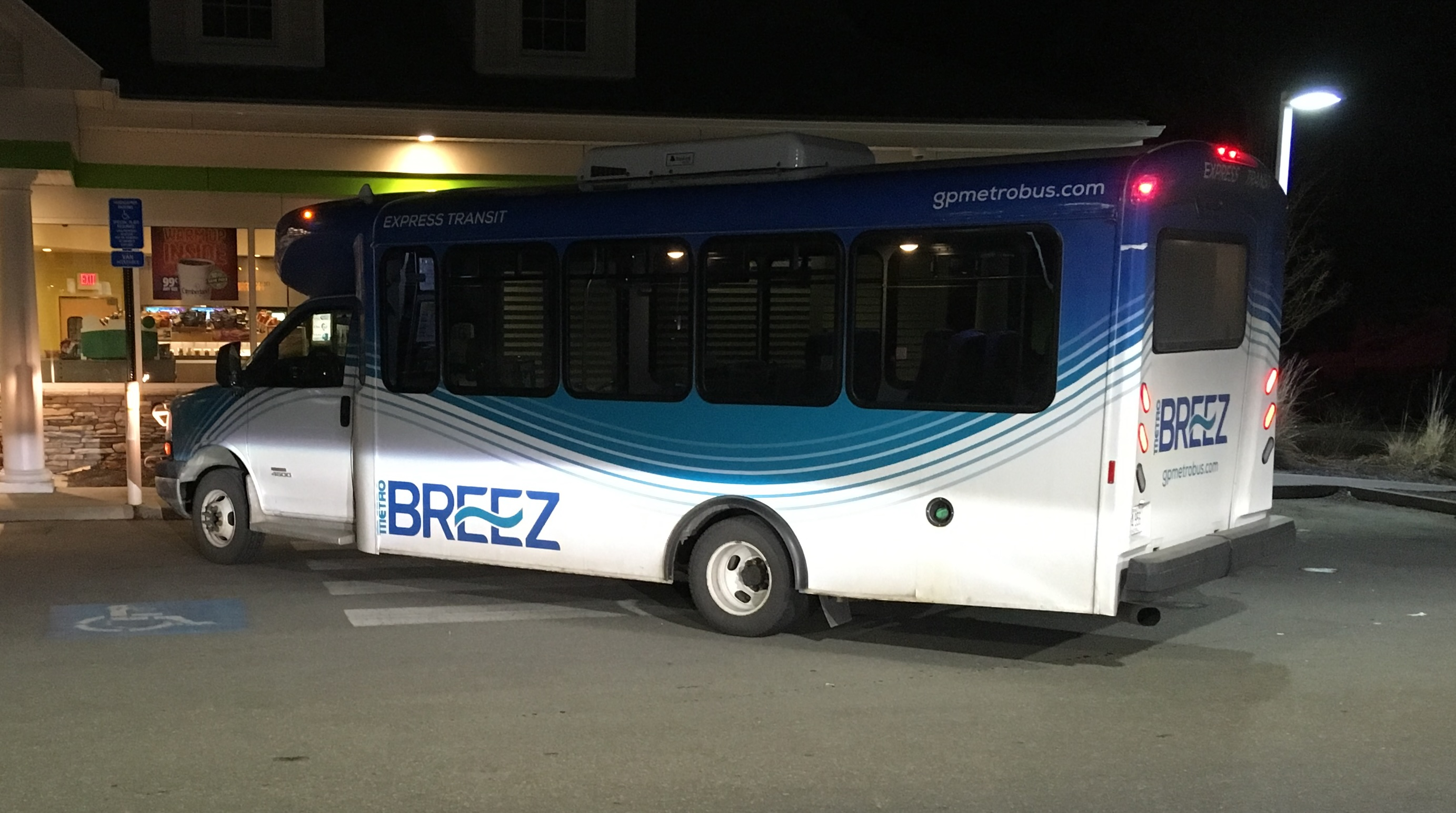
- A Breez bus, pictured in 2016

Overview
- Operator: Greater Portland Metro
- Began service: 2016

Route
- Locale: Southern Maine, U.S.
- Communities served: Portland, Yarmouth, Freeport and Brunswick
- Start: Portland Transportation Center
- End: Brunswick station
- Length: 30 miles (48 km)

Service
- Operates: Monday to Saturday
- Annual patronage: 73,461 (as of March 2022)
- Transfers: Yes

The Metro Breez (stylized METRO BREEZ) is an express bus service in southern Maine, United States, provided by Greater Portland Metro. It runs fifteen times on weekdays and six times on Saturdays between Portland, the state's largest city, and Brunswick, around 30 miles (48 km) to the northeast, with stops in Yarmouth and Freeport. In 2025, it added two daily round trips to Bath Iron Works (BIW) as a pilot scheme. It ends in October 2026.

The Breez service was established in 2016, after a successful pilot project, via an Act of the 129th Maine Legislature. Its long-term potential was to reduce congestion on Interstate 295, on which the service runs for part of its route. The route initially ran between Portland and Freeport, but was expanded to Brunswick in 2017. Falmouth was removed from the route around the same time; this route was already served by the route 7 Falmouth Flyer.

Each bus offers free Wi-Fi.

== History ==
The project was begun with federal funding from the Federal Highway Administration's Congestion Mitigation and Air Quality Program. With this being phased out after three years, it was partially replaced with continual support from the Federal Transit Administration's Section 3507 Formula Funding Program, with the rest of the funding being provided by the towns serviced by the route. In addition, each town would be allocated one seat on the Metro board, with Portland's representation increased from five seats to eight, in order to maintain the city's having at least, but no more than, 50% of the seats on the board.

In 2014, Greater Portland Metro worked with the town of Freeport and Yarmouth to seek funding for an express bus service between the two towns and Portland. A three-year trial period was enacted, with startup funding provided by the Maine Department of Transportation (MDOT). Routes, bus stops, service levels and schedules were organized the following year.

The Metro Breez was officially launched in June 2016.

The service was expanded to Brunswick on August 24, 2017. The schedule was amended to provide a higher frequency of service during peak times on weekdays, plus an evening service and an extended Saturday service.

In 2018, northbound and southbound stops were added outside Maine Beer Company on U.S. Route 1, adjacent to the MDOT park-and-ride lot.

In March 2019, Freeport Town Council received ridership statistics to accompany the town's plans to continue operating the service in the town. In a three-year study, undertaken during a pilot phase, ridership exceeded expectations of 42,800 and 45,000, with 52,899 and 64,646, between 2017 and 2018 and 2018 to 2019.

Two months later, Breez and the Amtrak Downeaster rail service established a partnership to promote public transportation options between Portland, Freeport and Brunswick. A pricing agreement was put in place, with a $3 one-way fare, a $27 ten-ride pass, and a $90 monthly option.

In 2020, discussions began regarding a potential southern expansion to Scarborough and Saco.

A stop was added at Thompson's Point in Portland in 2021, and a twice-daily round trip to Bath Iron Works (BIW) was added in 2025 as a pilot scheme running until October 2026.

Senator Susan Collins (R) announced $1.8 million funding for public transport in Greater Portland in 2022, with the Metro using their portion to purchase four 35-foot, environmentally friendly buses to replace its aging fleet. The buses were launched in April 2023, with all rides being free on April 22 and 23 to celebrate the event.

== Route ==
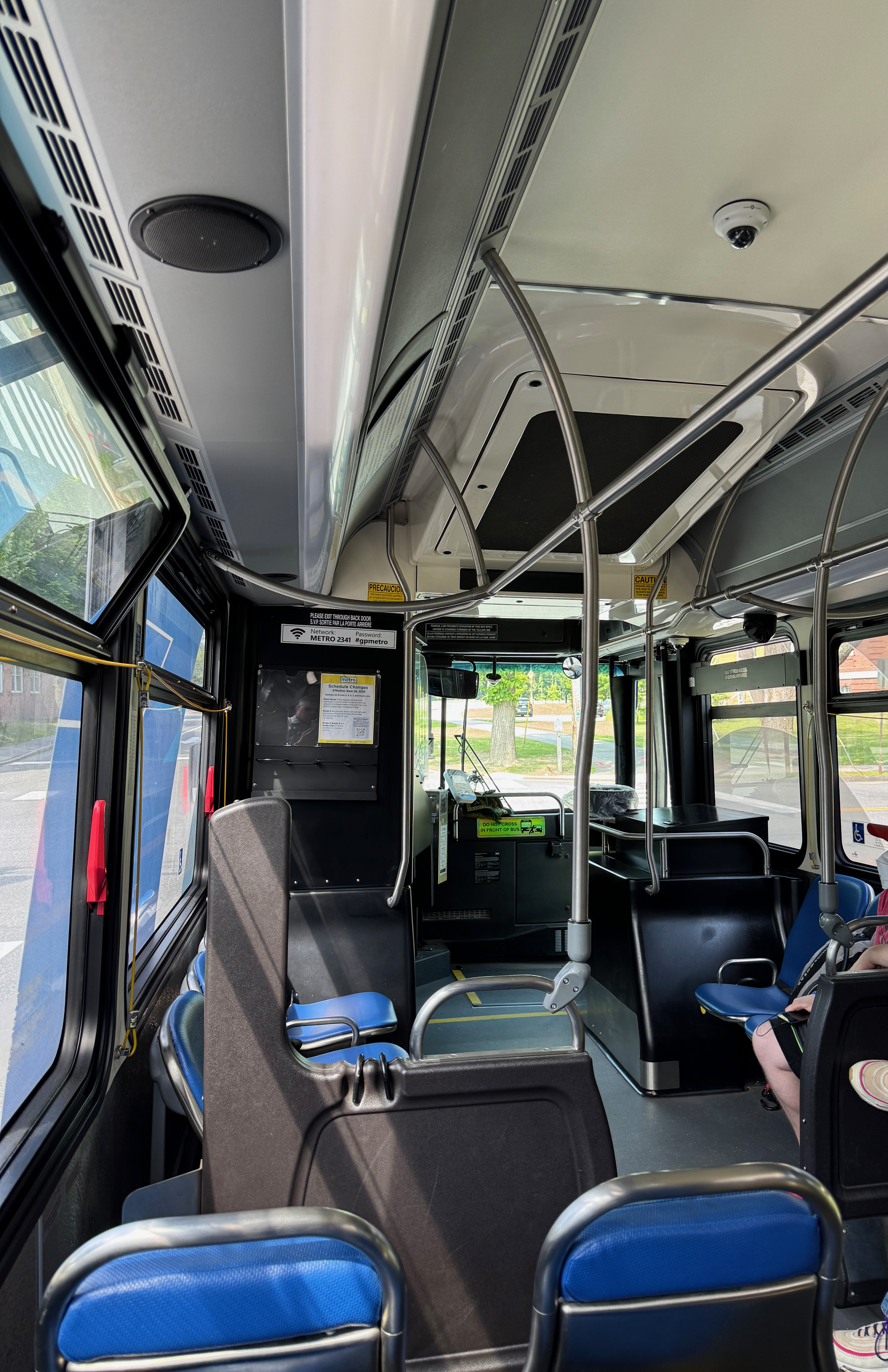
Aboard the Breez

The outbound service begins at Thompson's Point, with its first stop being at the adjacent Portland Transportation Center. It then continues southeast, along Congress Street, passing by Maine Medical Center, Longfellow Square and Congress Square, before its second stop at Monument Square, near Portland Public Library. Continuing along Congress Street, the route turns left onto Washington Avenue at the foot of Munjoy Hill.

After leaving the Portland peninsula, the service travels north on Interstate 295 from Tukey's Bridge to exit 15 in Yarmouth. After stopping at the exit 15 park and ride, beside U.S. Route 1, it makes two other stops in the town: at Yarmouth Town Hall on Main Street and in front of the Hannaford supermarket plaza back on Route 1.

Continuing north on Route 1, the service makes four stops in Freeport (all on Route 1): at the Maine Beer Company park and ride, the L.L. Bean headquarters, Freeport Town Hall and at the L.L. Bean flagship store on Main Street.

The service returns to I-295 en route to Brunswick, where it stops at Church Road (on Route 1), the Maine Street park and ride, the Amtrak station and, finally, Bowdoin College. The inbound journey stops at River Road on Route 1.

Journeys take around one hour each way.

== See also ==
- Public transportation in Maine
