= Greater Portland Landmarks =

- Founded: 1964 (62 years ago)
- Type: Non-profit
- Purpose: Preserving and protecting historic buildings
- Headquarters: 511 Congress Street
- Location: Portland, Maine, U.S.
- Region served: Greater Portland, Maine, U.S.
- Services: Preservation
- Key people: Bruce Roullard (president); Kate Lemos McHale (executive director)
- Website: https://www.portlandlandmarks.org/

Greater Portland Landmarks is a preservation organization founded in 1964 and based in Portland, Maine, United States. It was formed three years after the demolition of the city's Union Station, during the Urban Renewal movement, with the intention of preventing further such losses.

The company is also the custodian of the Portland Observatory on Munjoy Hill. The structure is included on the company's logo.

As of 2024, the president of Greater Portland Landmarks is Bruce Roullard. Its executive director is Kate Lemos McHale.

== History ==
Greater Portland Landmarks received two grants in 2022, one of which (from the National Trust for Historic Preservation) was to fund the search for sites in Greater Portland related to its Armenian American, Chinese American and African American heritage.

In 2024, it sued the City of Portland in an attempt to prevent the demolition of the building, constructed in 1830, which was formerly the home of the Children's Museum and Theatre of Maine. The City Council had approved a plan to remove a historic classification from the building, which stands in Free Street in Congress Square.
