= St. John Street (Portland, Maine) =

Street in Portland, Maine, United States

Coordinates: 43.6534°N 70.2795°W

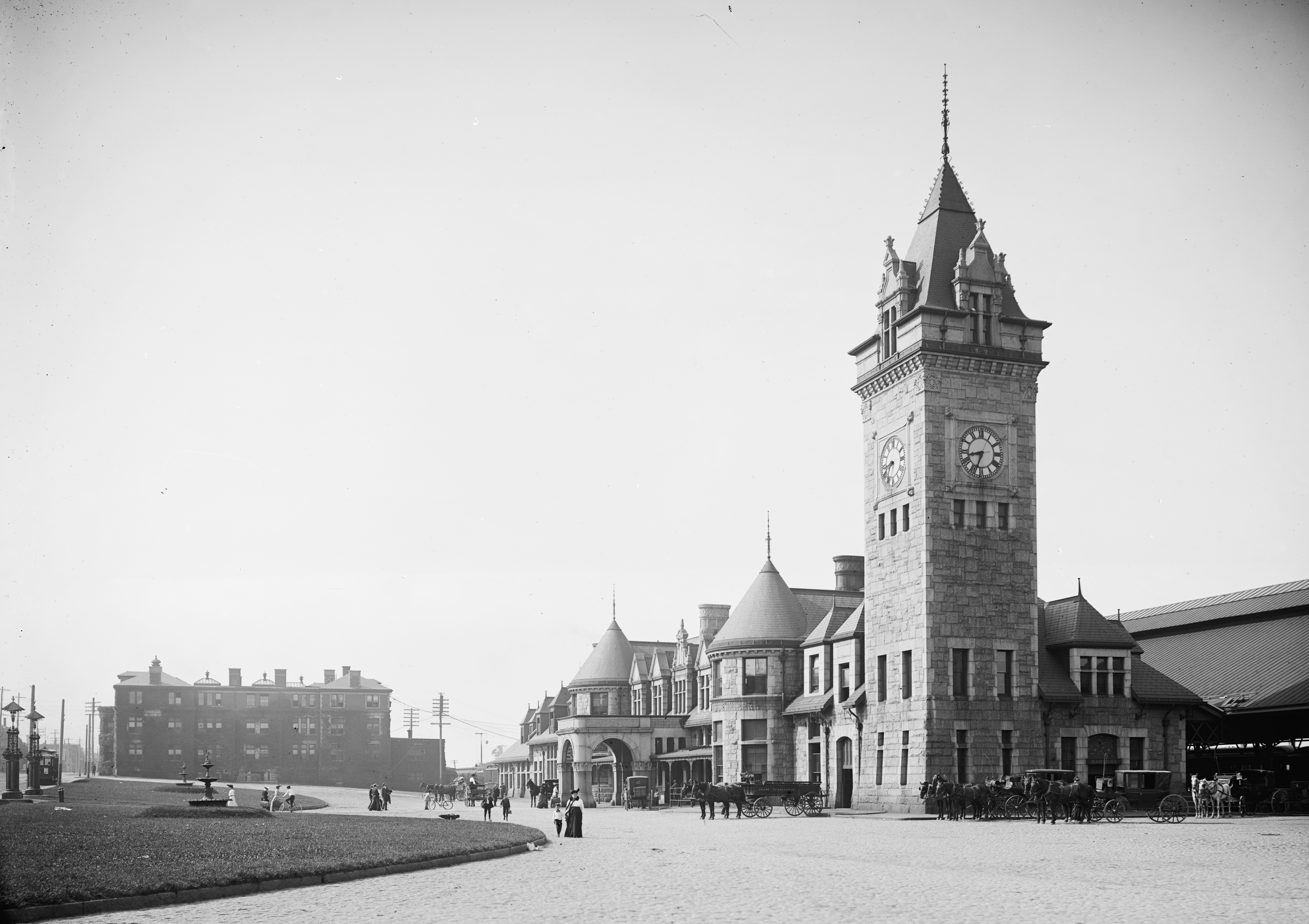
- Portland's former Union Station stood on St. John Street for 73 years
- Interactive map of St. John Street
- Length: 1.34 mi (2.16 km)
- Location: Portland, Maine, U.S.
- North end: SR 25 (Brighton Avenue) & Devonshire Street
- South end: Valley & Danforth Streets

St. John Street is a street in Portland, Maine, United States. It runs for around 1.34 miles (2.16 km) from Brighton Avenue (part of Maine State Route 25), in the north, to Valley Street, in the south. It crosses Park Avenue (part of Maine State Route 22) and Congress Street and passes beneath Interstate 295.

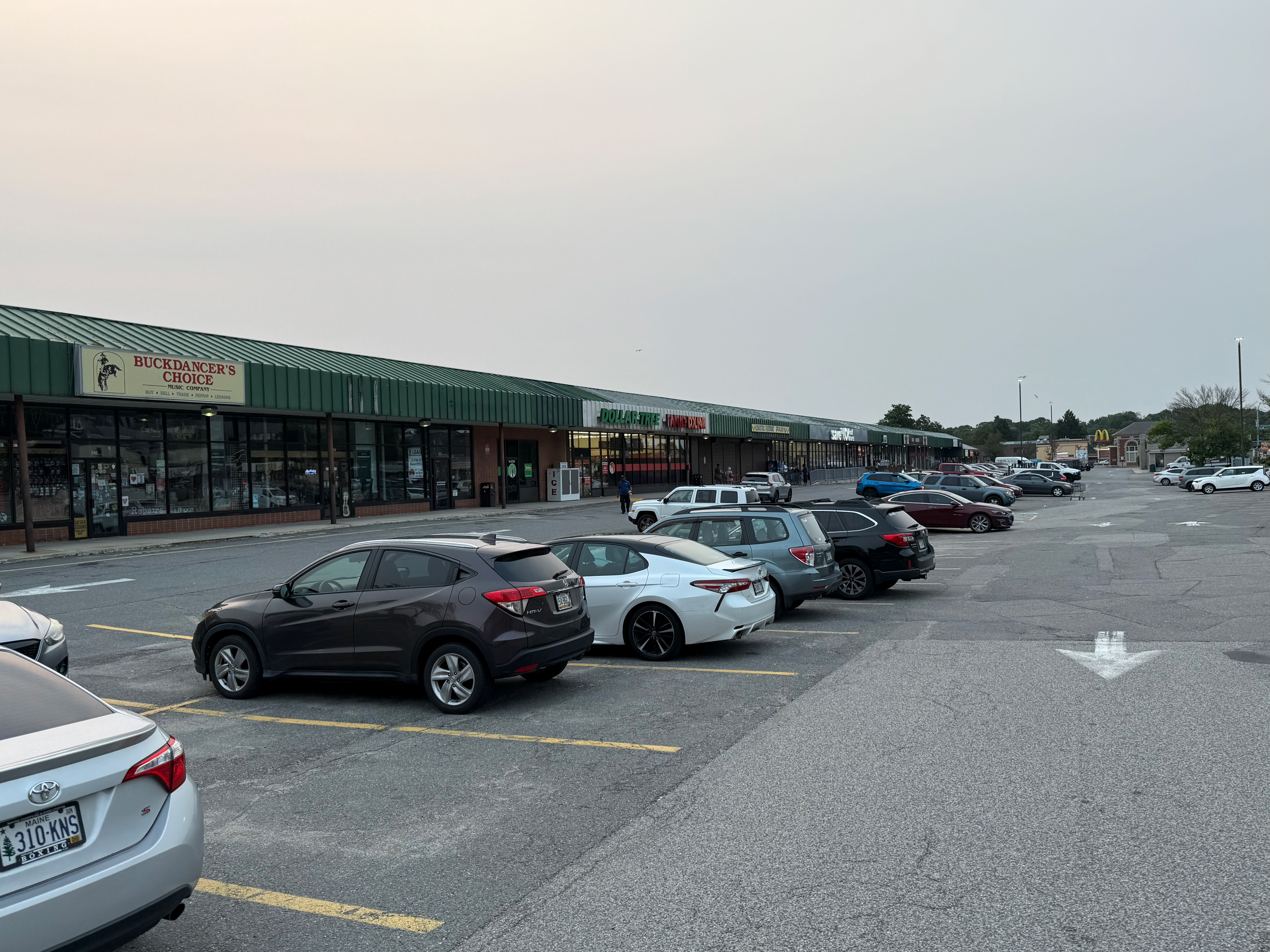
Union Station Plaza, which now occupies the former site of Union Station

Both St. John Street and adjacent Valley Street were built upon land occupied by Portland's poor farm. St. John Street is named for St. John Smith (1876–1944), a landowner friend and business partner of industrialist John Bundy Brown.

The city's Union Station stood in Railroad Square on St. John Street between 1888 and 1961, when it was demolished and replaced with today's Union Station Plaza strip mall. Beside that location, to the south, is the Maine Central Railroad General Office Building, which was completed in 1916. It is listed on the National Register of Historic Places. A spur of the Portland and Ogdensburg Railway from Union Station crosses Maine Central Railroad's trestle bridge at St. John Street and Park Avenue. The line continues behind Hadlock Field and Fitzpatrick Stadium before ending at Forest Avenue, beside Deering Oaks Park.

The Inn at St. John (formerly the Hotel Victoria), which stands at the intersection of St. John Street and Congress Street, has been in operation since 1897. Its location was chosen because of its proximity to Union Station.

St. John Street was home to Portland's first McDonald's. It is still in operation.

Portland's Greyhound bus station was formerly located at the intersection of St. John Street and Congress Street, opposite The Inn at St. John. The building, constructed in 1961, closed in 2019, after 32 years of ownership by Greyhound. Buses now depart from the park and ride lot on Marginal Way.

== Public transportation ==
Greater Portland Metro's route number 1 serves St. John Street as part of its journey between Portland Transportation Center and Portland Public Library. The company's bus depot is located between St. John Street and Valley Street.
