= Children's Museum & Theatre of Maine =

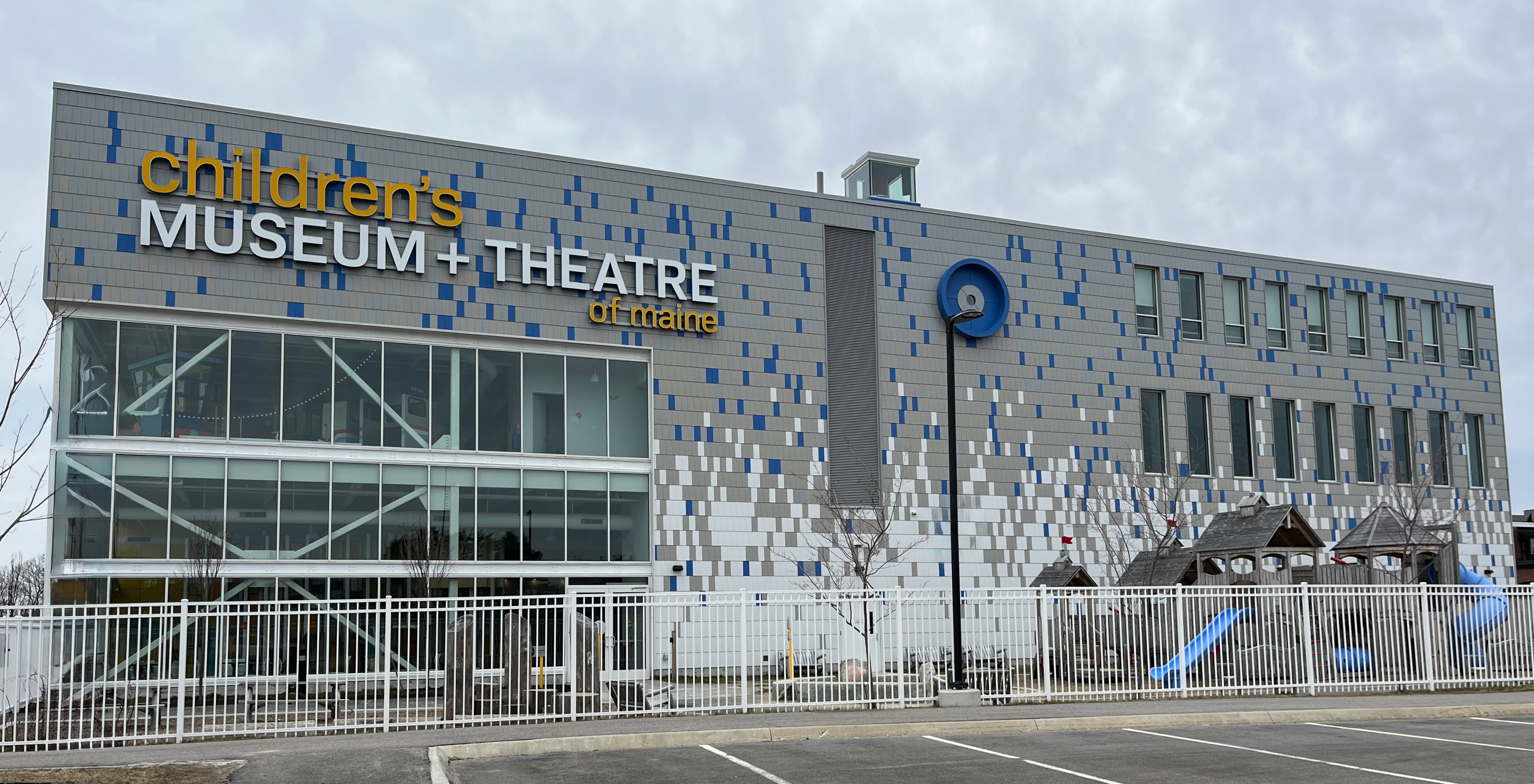
- The building in 2023
- Established: Museum: 1976 Theatre: 1923
- Location: 250 Thompson's Point Road, Portland, Maine 04102
- Coordinates: 43°39′03″N 70°17′27″W
- Type: Children's museum
- Director: Julie Butcher Pezzino
- Website: www.kitetails.org

Children's Museum & Theatre of Maine is located on Thompson's Point in Portland, Maine, and features a wide variety of interactive exhibits and activities for children and families.

== History ==
=== Children's Museum of Maine ===
The Children's Museum & Theatre of Maine was founded by the Junior League of Portland in 1970, opening in just a few rooms in Fort Williams Park in Cape Elizabeth. In 1980 the Museum moved to a Victorian home on Stevens Avenue in Portland. After more than a decade of successful exhibits and programs, the Museum once again needed a new space to accommodate growing interest. In 1991 a capital campaign was launched, and two years later in 1993 the Museum opened to the public in a grand new home, the former Chamber of Commerce building on Free Street in downtown Portland. It has since been home to dozens of large-scale interactive exhibits, both permanent and rotating. In 2001, after careful assessment of community needs, the Museum chose to direct programming and exhibits toward children 6 months to 10 years of age, and selected three areas of focus: science education, early childhood education and multicultural education.

=== Children's Theatre of Maine ===
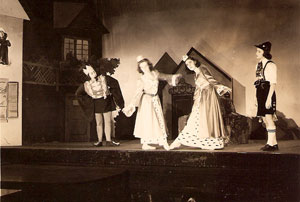
12 Dancing Princesses 1942

The history of the Children's Theatre of Maine dates back to 1923, when the Junior League of Portland began producing small shows for young audiences under the name Children's Theatre of Portland (adopting the name Children's Theatre of Maine in 1974). In the 1930s, the shows began to incorporate children as performers, and the tradition of shows for and by kids was born. The Children's Theatre rehearsed and performed in donated locations all over Greater Portland, and in the summer of 1944 debuted their Trailer Theatre, a traveling fold-out stage that brought outdoor shows to parks and playgrounds throughout the city. In the 1950s, actors Bette Davis and Gary Merrill took the Children's Theatre under their wing; Davis arranged to premiere her film The Virgin Queen in Portland as a benefit for the cause. Throughout the latter half of the century, the Children's Theatre experimented with many locations, models, and creative strategies.

=== Children's Museum & Theatre of Maine ===
Children's Museum & Theatre of Maine celebrated the merger in 2008 by producing The Twelve Dancing Princesses in the Dress-Up Theatre followed by The Seussification of Romeo and Juliet. After many months of developing a new brand, the new "kitetails" logo was revealed in April 2009 at the Children's Museum & Theatre of Maine Annual Auction. The Museum & Theatre saw many changes over the next few months. The DinoTracks exhibit opened in May 2009 in the main gallery, the fifth in a series of science exhibits the Museum & Theatre had been creating since 2006 with the Environmental Exhibits Collaborative (EEC). Shortly afterwards, the rainy month of July 2009 crippled many businesses in Portland but the Museum & Theatre thrived and welcomed over 14,000 visitors. The record number of visitors had a chance to explore the Have a Ball! exhibit, which was given a permanent home in the front gallery. In the drier month of September, Children's Museum & Theatre of Maine held its 4th Annual Golf Tournament at Nonesuch River Golf Course and the Kids on the Block educational puppet program started rehearsals and performances in the Dress-Up Theatre. The 2009-2010 theatre season began with Everyone Knows What a Dragon Looks Like and included The Polar Express at Maine Narrow Gauge Railroad, The Emperor's New Clothes, Cinderella and The Rabbit Who Wanted Red Wings. Today, The Youth Ranger program continues to employ high school students as environmental educators and outreach programs bring the Children's Museum & Theatre of Maine experience to nearly 2,000 children and caregivers each year.

== Awards and recognition ==
Awards and recognition received include:

- Winner of the Nickelodeon Parents' Pick Award for the Best Museum for little kids and big kids (2008) and the Best Museum in Portland (2009)
