= Thompson's Point, Maine =

Thompson's Point
- Promontory
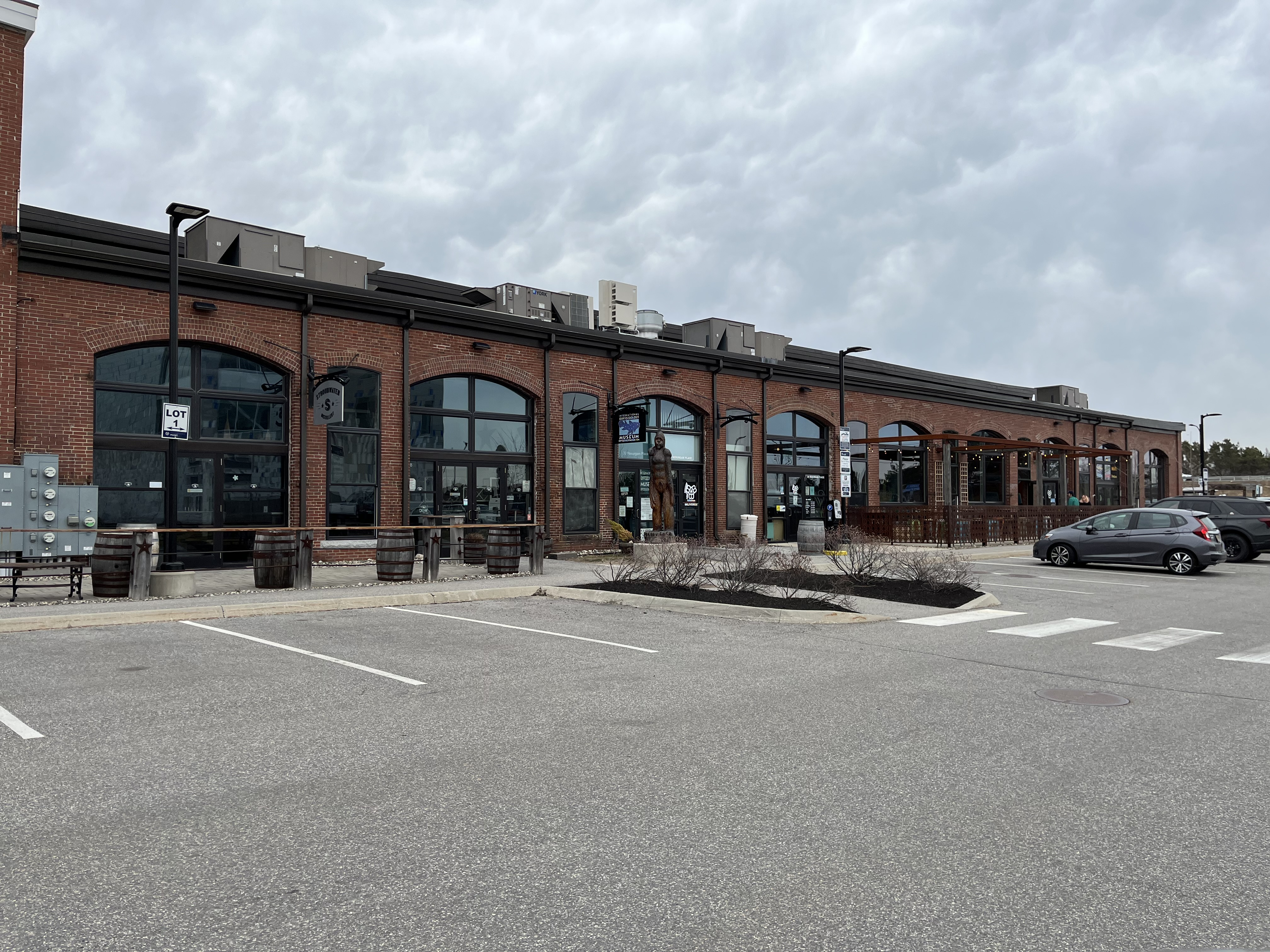
- Businesses at Thompson's Point
- Interactive map of Thompson's Point
- Coordinates: 43.6507146364°N 70.291450521°W
- Country: United States
- State: Maine
- County: Cumberland
- Town: Portland
- Time zone: UTC-5 (Eastern (EST))
  - Summer (DST): UTC-4 (EDT)

Thompson's Point is a promontory and entertainment venue in the Libbytown neighborhood of Portland, Maine, United States. It is located around 1.7 miles (2.7 km) southwest of downtown Portland, on the northern banks of the Fore River. It sits across the river from the outflow of Long Creek in South Portland. Interstate 295 and U.S. Route 1 pass beside it to the east.

Thompson's Point served as a port for barge and boat traffic on the Cumberland and Oxford Canal in the 19th century. Several historic brick structures remain from its days as a train repair and storage facility in the second half of the 19th century, due to its proximity to Pan Am Railways' Mountain Branch line, formerly the Mountain Division of the Maine Central Railroad.

Today, it is a venue for outdoor summer concerts and ice-skating in the winter.

The Children's Museum & Theatre of Maine moved here from Free Street, beside the Portland Museum of Art, in 2020.

== Transportation ==
Greater Portland Metro's Metro Breez express bus and bus route number 1 services begin and terminate at Thompson's Point.
