= Union Station (Portland, Maine) =

Former train station in Portland, Maine, U.S.

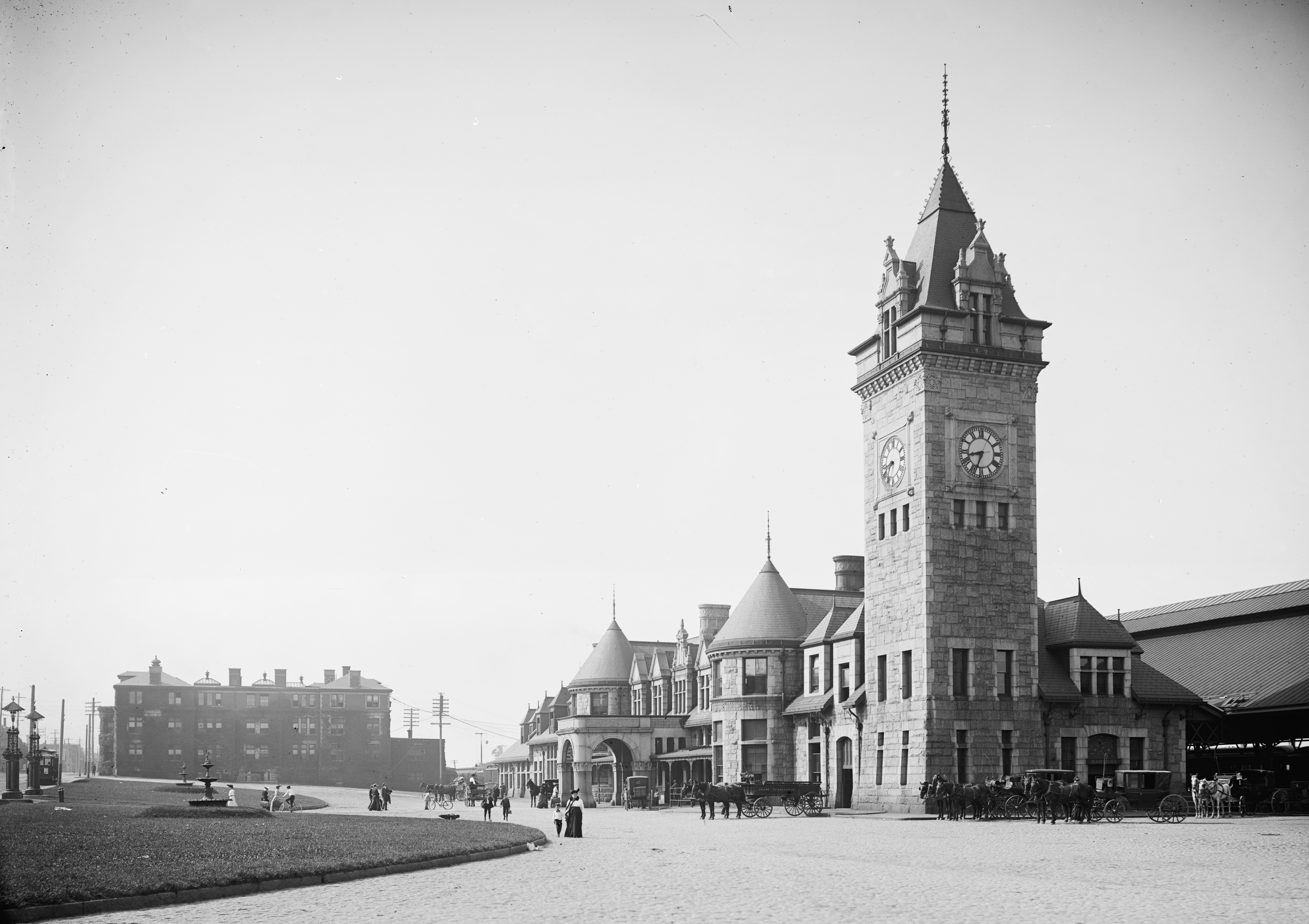
- Union Station, c. 1909

General information
- Location: St. John Street, Portland, Maine
- Coordinates: 43.6522°N 70.2804°W
- Operator: Boston and Maine Railroad; Maine Central Railroad

History
- Opened: June 25, 1888
- Closed: October 30, 1960

Key dates
- August 31, 1961: demolished

Former services
Preceding station	Boston and Maine Railroad	Following station
Rigby toward Boston	Western Route	Terminus
Rigby toward Boston	Eastern Route	Terminus
Preceding station	Maine Central Railroad	Following station
Terminus	Main Line	Woodfords toward Bangor
Terminus	Portland – Waterville via Lewiston	Woodfords toward Waterville
Cumberland Mills toward St. Johnsbury	White Mountains Line	Terminus
Location

Union Station was a train station in the Libbytown neighborhood of Portland, Maine, which operated from 1888 to 1960. Located on St. John Street, it was demolished in 1961 and is now the site of a strip mall.

== History ==
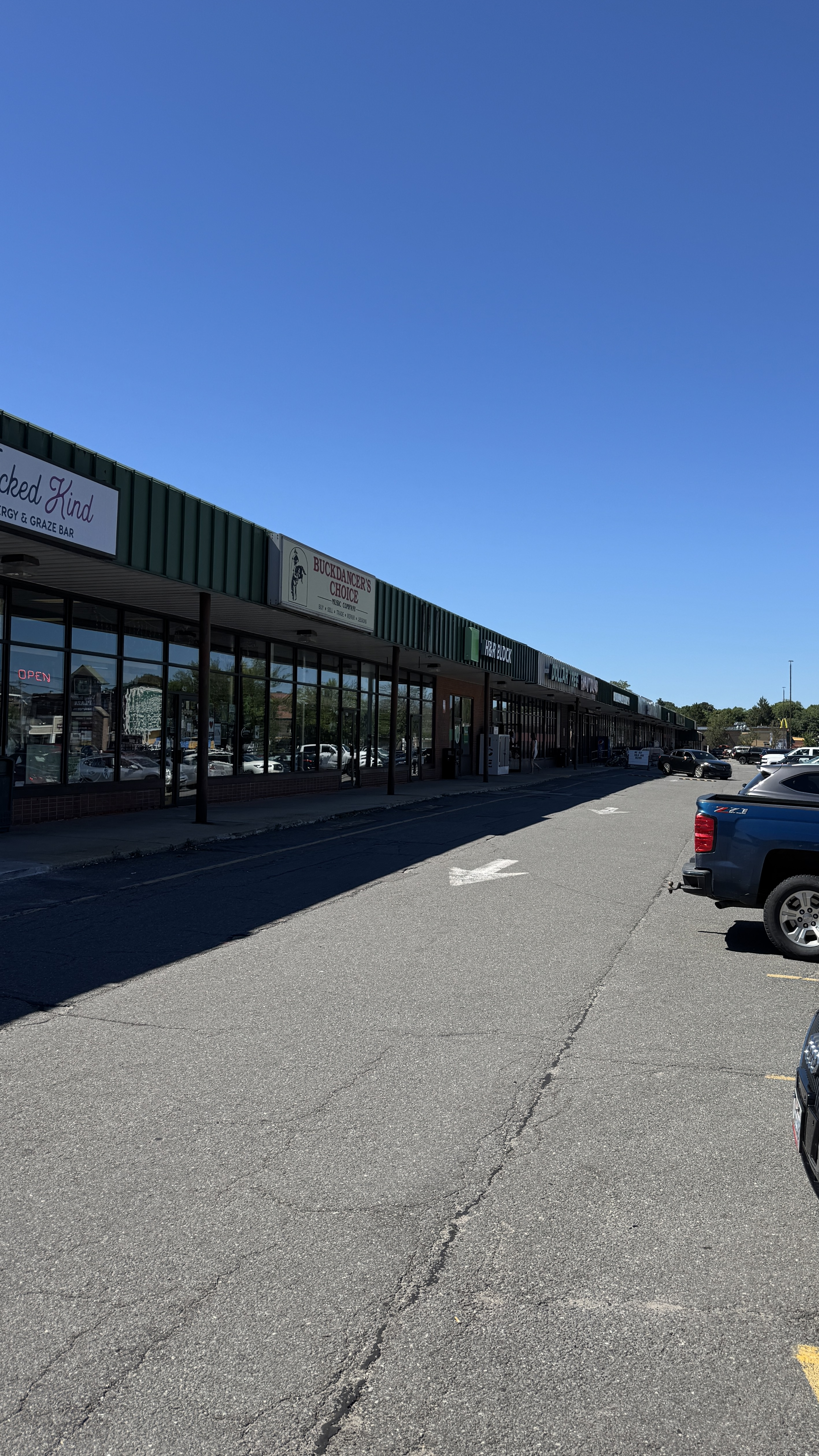
Union Station Plaza, which now occupies the former site of the station

The station was designed by Boston architects Bradlee, Winslow & Wetherell, after medieval French châteaux. It was a primarily granite building, with a 188-foot (57 m) clock tower. The union station opened on June 25, 1888, serving trains of the Boston and Maine, Maine Central, and Portland and Ogdensburg railroads. The Grand Trunk Railway continued to use a different station two miles away on India Street.

In September 1960, the Maine Central ended passenger rail service to the station. The last train departed on October 30, when the Boston and Maine moved its remaining trains out of the facility, though it would continue to operate Portland-Boston service until 1965.

On August 31, 1961, the train station was demolished. A strip mall was later built on the property.

The demolition led to the 1964 creation of Greater Portland Landmarks, a preservationist group.

== Passenger trains ==
Noteworthy trains into the 1950s and in some cases to 1960:

- Boston and Maine:
  - East Wind (Portland-Washington, DC) (summer only)
  - State of Maine (Portland-New York City)
- Boston and Maine and Maine Central Railroad
  - Bar Harbor Express (Ellsworth-Washington, DC) (summer only):
  - Flying Yankee (Bangor-Boston, via Lewiston)
  - Gull (Halifax-Boston via Lewiston)
  - Penobscot (Bangor-Boston via Augusta)
  - Pine Tree (Bangor-Boston via Augusta)
- Maine Central Railroad:
  - unnamed trains to Bangor via Lewiston, to Bangor via Augusta, to Rockland, to Calais via Ellsworth, to Farmington, to Montreal via North Conway

A proposal to move Amtrak's Downeaster service from the Portland Transportation Center to a site near Union Station's original location has been endorsed by the Maine Department of Transportation.

== See also ==
- Portland Railroad Company, a streetcar line that served Union Station
