= Arts District (Portland, Maine) =

Area of Portland, Maine, United States

Coordinates: 43°39′20″N 70°15′40″W

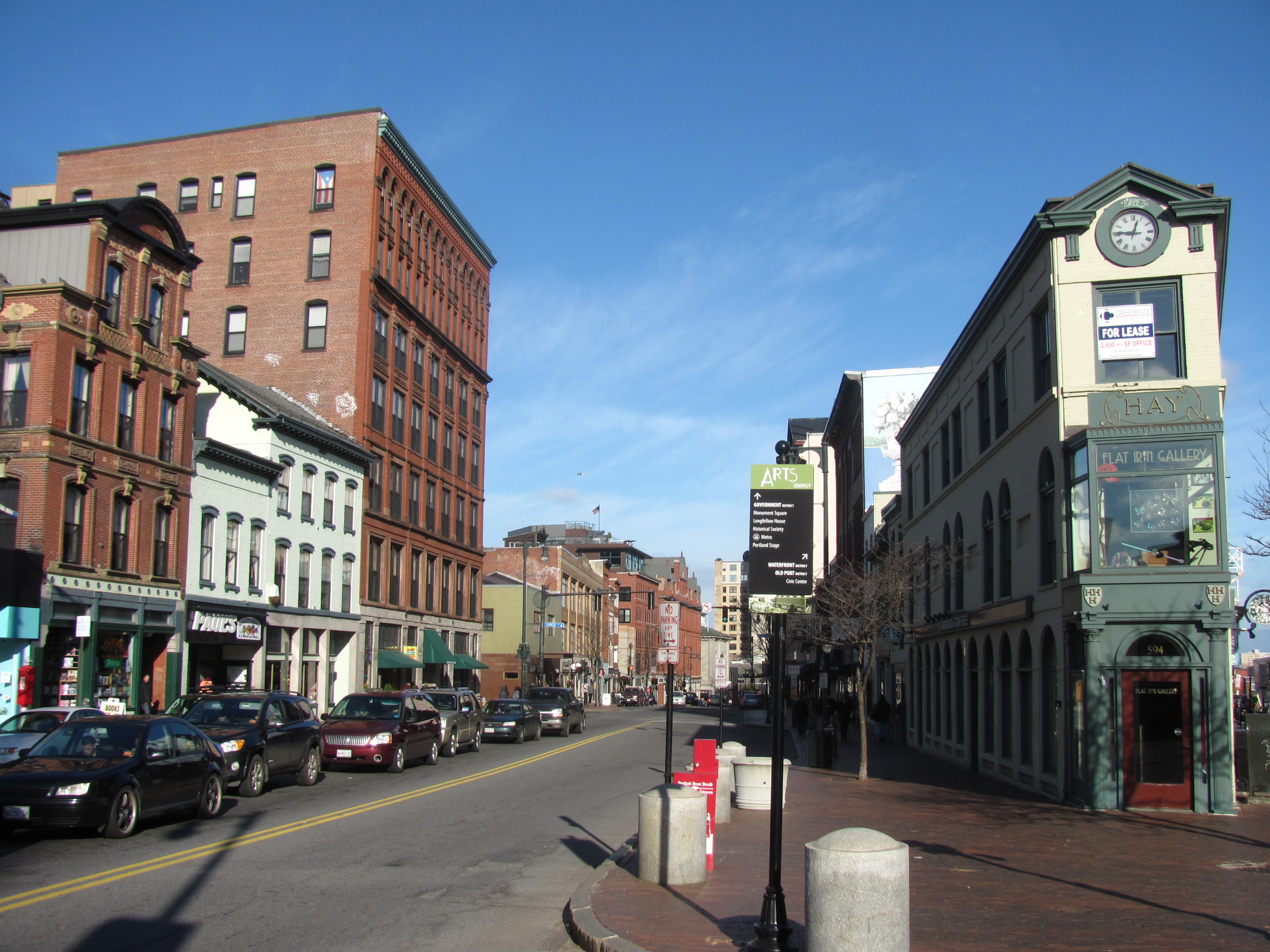
Congress Street, viewed from High Street

The Arts District is a section of downtown Portland, Maine’s designated in 1995 as to promote the cultural community and creative economy of the city. It covers a large part of upper Congress Street towards the West End and spans Congress Street toward the East ending at Portland City Hall and its Merrill Auditorium concert hall.

== Arts and culture organizations ==
There are many art galleries, a theater company, museums, and schools in the general area. Maine College of Art & Design (MECA&D), the Institute of Contemporary Art at Maine College of Art & Design, and Portland Museum of Art are located in the district. The Maine Historical Society, the Wadsworth-Longfellow House, the Maine Charitable Mechanics Association and the Portland Public Library are located in the district.

The Arts District is home to two television stations (WCSH and WMTW) and several radio stations. It is also home to the State Theatre building, the Portland Stage Company and One Longfellow Square. There are many coffee shops, bars and restaurants in the district.

== Parks and squares ==
There are multiple parks and squares in the Arts District. Congress Square Park, a small urban park across the street from the Museum of Art, often referred to as the "Heart of the Arts District," frequently hosts community-based arts, cultural, performance and market events. Monument Square is a square on Congress Street near Preble and Elm streets lined with restaurants and shops. Monument Square is centered on the Our Lady of Victories monument. Longfellow Square is at the intersection of Congress and State streets. It features a seated statue of noted 19th-century poet Henry Wadsworth Longfellow.

== First Friday Art Walk ==
An event that occurs in the Arts District is the First Friday Art Walk — a self-guided tour that takes place on the first Friday of each month from 5 p.m. to 8 p.m. All of the galleries, museums, and local businesses open their doors to the public for a view of everything that is going on in the art community. Most galleries host the event with food and drink. The Portland Museum of Art opens its doors to the public free of charge.
