= Statue of Henry Wadsworth Longfellow =

Statue of Henry Wadsworth Longfellow may refer to:

- Henry Wadsworth Longfellow Memorial
- Henry Wadsworth Longfellow Monument
