= Etz Chaim Synagogue =

Synagogue in Portland, Maine

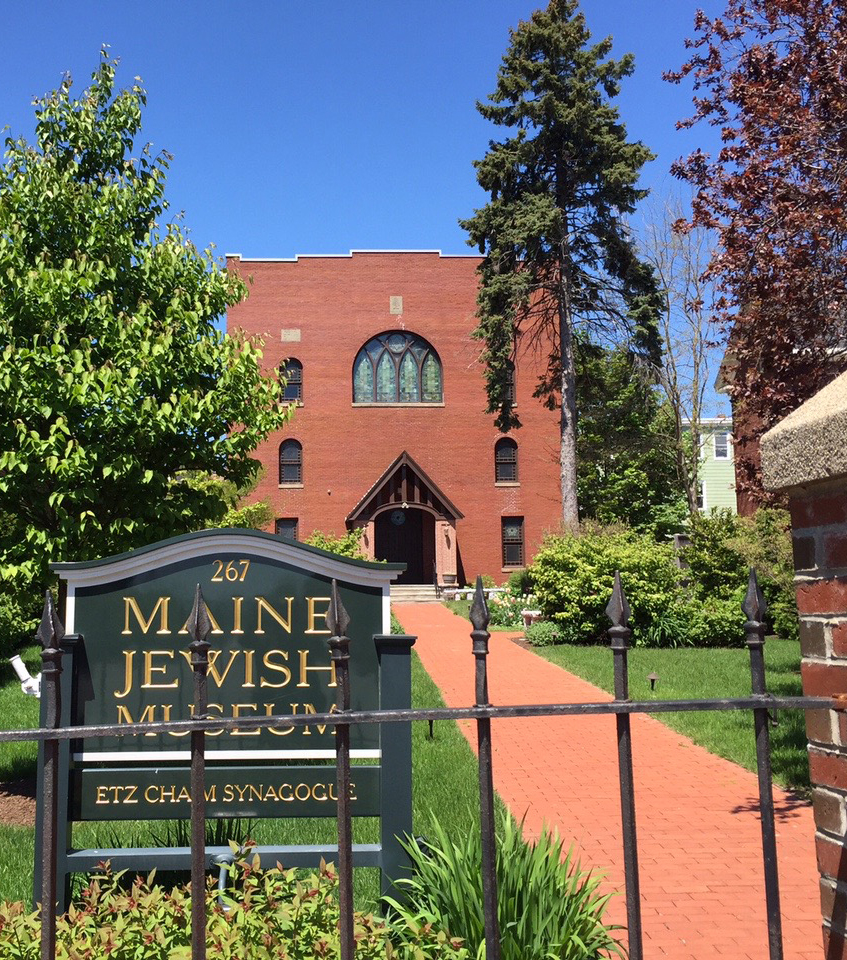
- Exterior view of the synagogue, in 2015

- Location in Maine

Religion
- Affiliation: Judaism
- Rite: Orthodox Nusach Sefard (1917–c. 2003); Non-denominational (since c. 2003)
- Ecclesiastical or organizational status: Synagogue; Jewish history museum
- Leadership: Rabbi Gary S. Berenson

Location
- Location: 267 Congress Street, Portland, Maine 04101
- Country: United States
- Interactive map of Etz Chaim Synagogue
- Coordinates: 43°39′44″N 70°15′09″W

Architecture
- General contractor: Louis Serota
- Established: 1917 (as a congregation)
- Completed: 1921

Website
- etzchaim-portland.org

Etz Chaim Synagogue (transliterated from Hebrew as "Tree of Life") is a unaffiliated Jewish congregation, synagogue, and Jewish history museum, located at 267 Congress Street, at the head of India Street, in Portland, Maine, United States. The congregation is the only immigrant-era European-style synagogue remaining in Maine. It was founded in 1917 as an English-language Orthodox Sefardi congregation, rather than in the Yiddish-language tradition; and the synagogue was completed in 1921. In c. 2003, the dwindling Orthodox congregation became egalitarian and unaffiliated with any movement.

Gary S. Berenson is the congregation's rabbi.

Located in the India Street Historic District, the building has also housed the Maine Jewish Museum since 2010.
