= Congress Street (Portland, Maine) =

Street in Portland, Maine, US

Coordinates: 43.656872°N 70.259981°W

- Country Road (formerly); Back Street (formerly); Queen Street (formerly)
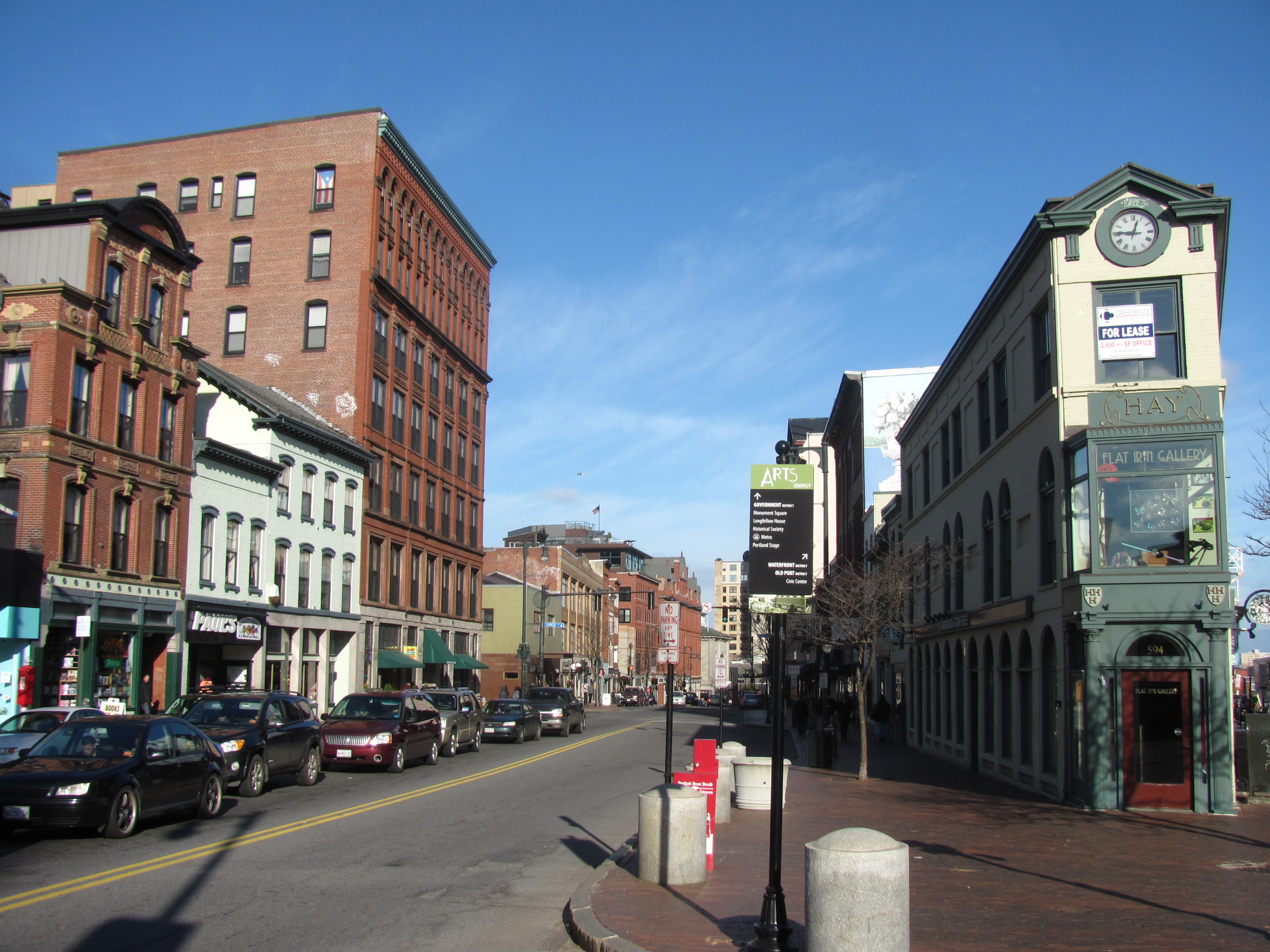
- Congress Street, looking northeast from Congress Square
- Interactive map of Congress Street
- Part of: SR 22; SR 9
- Length: 5.9 mi (9.5 km)
- Location: Portland, Maine, U.S.
- Southwest end: SR 22 (County Road)
- Northeast end: Eastern Promenade

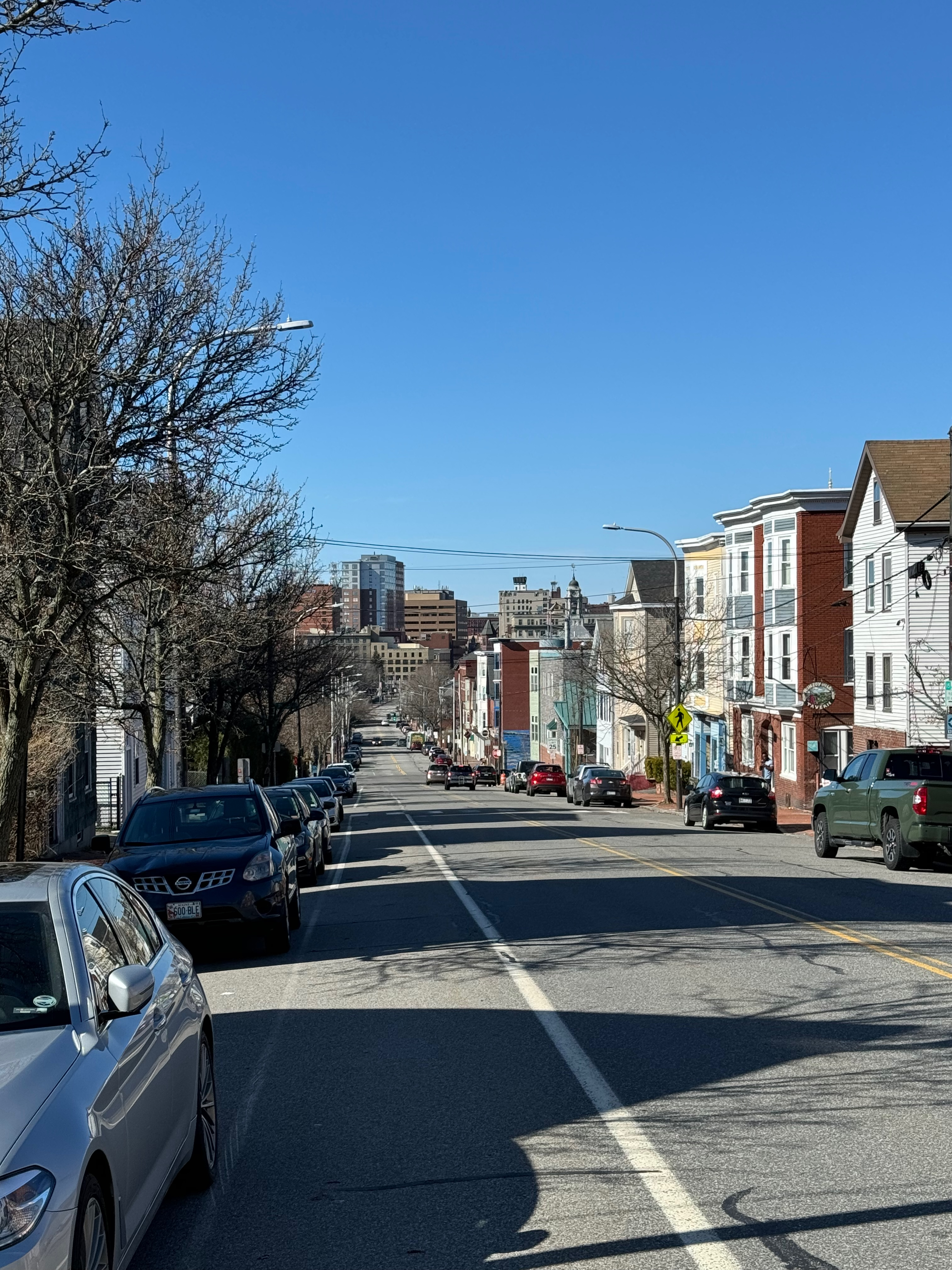
Looking southwest down Congress Street from Munjoy Hill toward downtown

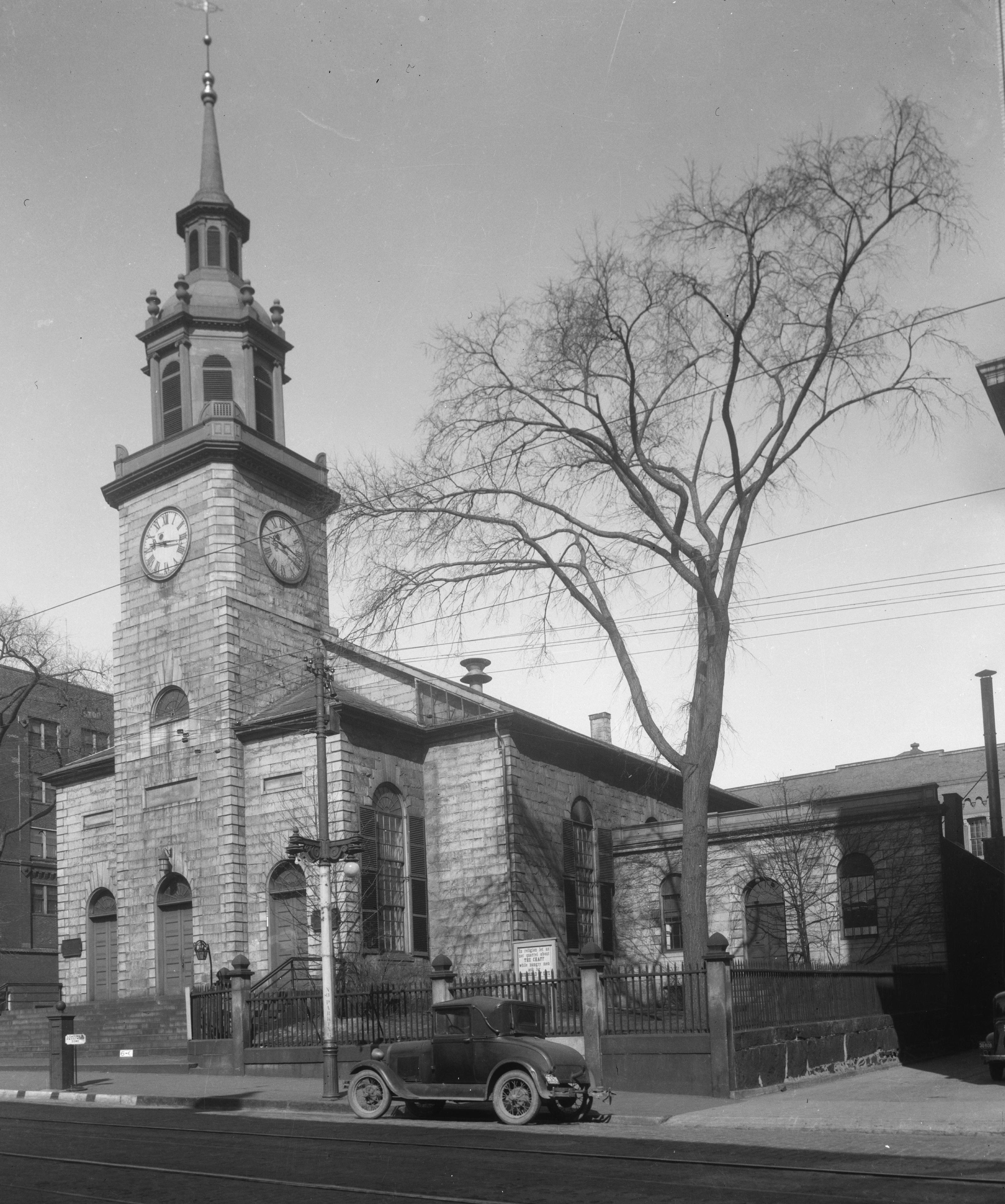
First Parish Church, located at 425 Congress Street.

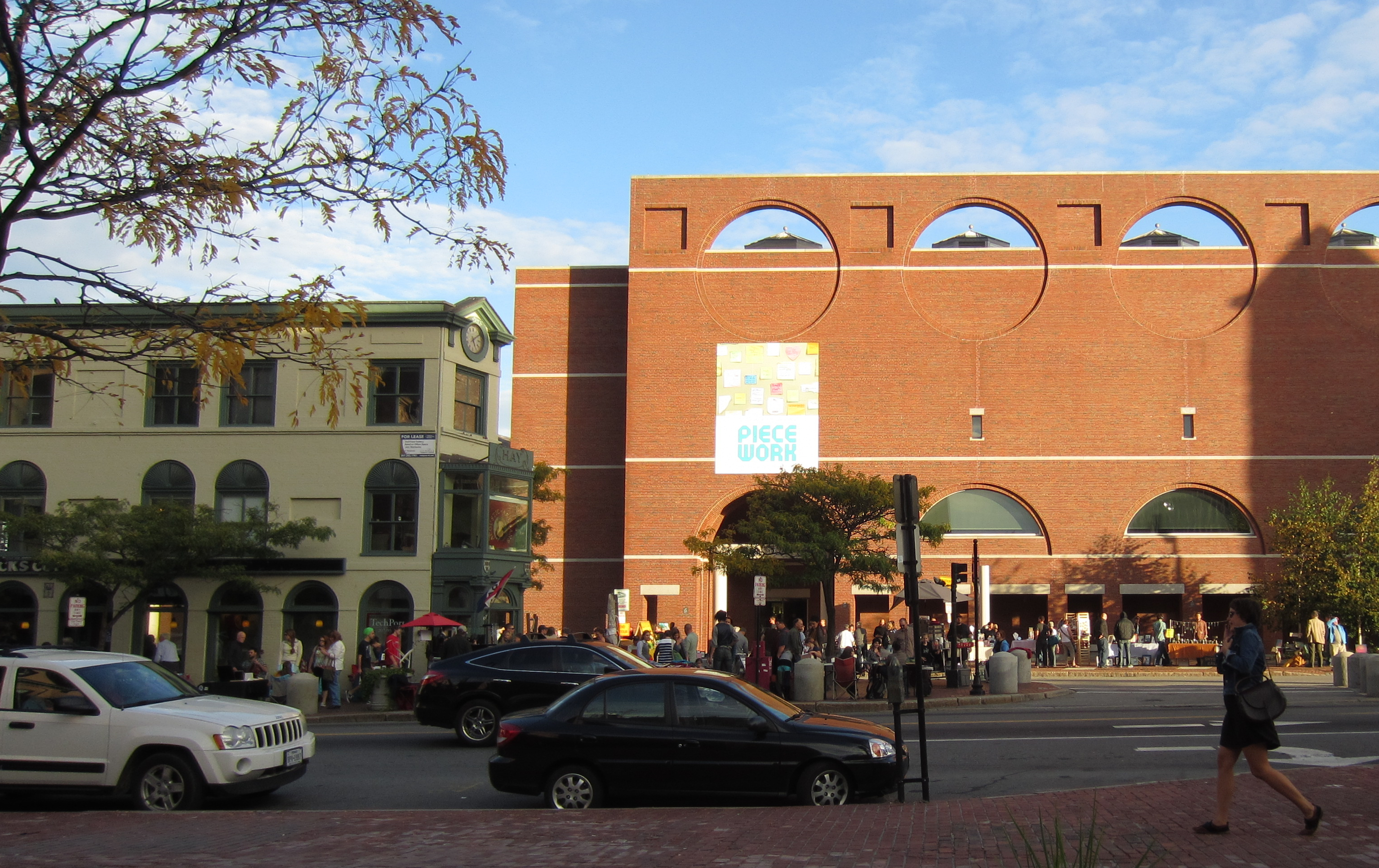
The Portland Museum of Art as viewed from Congress Square Park.

Congress Street is the main street in Portland, Maine. 5.9 miles (9.5 km) long, it stretches from County Road, Portland's southwestern border with Westbrook, through a number of neighborhoods, before ending overlooking the Eastern Promenade on Munjoy Hill. In March 2009, the Portland City Council designated much of the inner portion of Congress Street a historic district. The western section of the street includes the city's Arts District.

The street was formerly known as Country Road, Back Street and Queen Street. West of downtown Portland, the street is known colloquially as Outer Congress Street.

Portland City Hall stands at 389 Congress Street, at the head of Exchange Street.

== History ==
When what is now Portland was founded by British colonists in the early 18th century, the population settled primarily on the waterfront near today's India Street. Congress was laid out and originally known as Back Street and later Queen Street. The first prominent structures on the street were the First Parish Meeting House, built in 1740 and replaced to the present structure in the 1820s as well as the hay scales in Market Square, later known as Monument Square. From the early settlement of Portland until the American Revolutionary War period, Back Street was considered the far edge of the town. It took the name of Congress Street beginning in 1823.

In 1921, the Etz Chaim Synagogue was built on the eastern end of Congress Street, approaching Munjoy Hill. As of 2011, it was the only immigrant-era synagogue still functioning in Maine.

A study in 2011 sought to change a number of features on the street, including decreasing the number of stoplights and ending left hand turns off of the street. Greater Portland planners also called the street the most congested artery in the region.

== Notable addresses ==
- Munjoy Hill: Congress Street begins on the Eastern Promenade, located on Munjoy Hill
- Portland Observatory, 138 Congress Street, historic marine signal tower and museum
- Eastern Cemetery, bounded by Congress and Mountfort Street at the base of Munjoy Hill
- North School, 248–264 Congress Street
- Lincoln Park, between Pearl, Federal, Congress and Franklin streets
- Etz Chaim Synagogue, 267 Congress Street
- St. Paul's Church and Rectory, 279 Congress Street
- Cathedral of the Immaculate Conception, 307 Congress Street
- First Baptist Church, 353 Congress Street
- Central Fire Station, 380 Congress Street
- Press Herald Building, 390 Congress Street, between and Exchange and Market streets
- First Parish Church, 425 Congress Street
- Monument Square (also home to the Portland Public Library and One City Center buildings)
- Lancaster Block, 474 Congress Street
- Time and Temperature Building, 477 Congress Street
- Maine Historical Society and Wadsworth-Longfellow House, 489 Congress Street
- Mechanics' Hall, 519 Congress Street
- Porteous, Mitchell and Braun Company Building (home of the Maine College of Art & Design), 522–528 Congress Street
- Asa Hanson Block, 548–550 Congress Street
- Salt Institute for Documentary Studies, 561 Congress Street
- Green Elephant Vegetarian Bistro, 608 Congress Street
- State Theatre, 609 Congress Street
- Baxter Building, 619 Congress Street
- Lafayette Apartments (former Lafayette Hotel), 638 Congress Street
- Maine Eye and Ear Infirmary, 794–800 Congress Street
- Portland Museum of Art, Congress Square at the intersection of Free Street and High Street
- Congress Square Park, a small park on the corner of High and Congress Street
- Henry Wadsworth Longfellow Monument, located in Longfellow Square at the intersection of Congress Street and State Street
- West End: Congress Street passes through the West End
- Deacon John Bailey House, 1235 Congress Street
- Fore River Sanctuary, outer Congress Street
- Fore River, estuary in Portland crossed by Congress Street
- Stroudwater, historic district near Fore River
- Tate House, located just off of Congress Street in Stroudwater

The Second Parish Payson Memorial Church formerly stood to the right of City Hall, at Pearl Street, where the Top of the Old Port parking lot is today.

== Public transportation ==
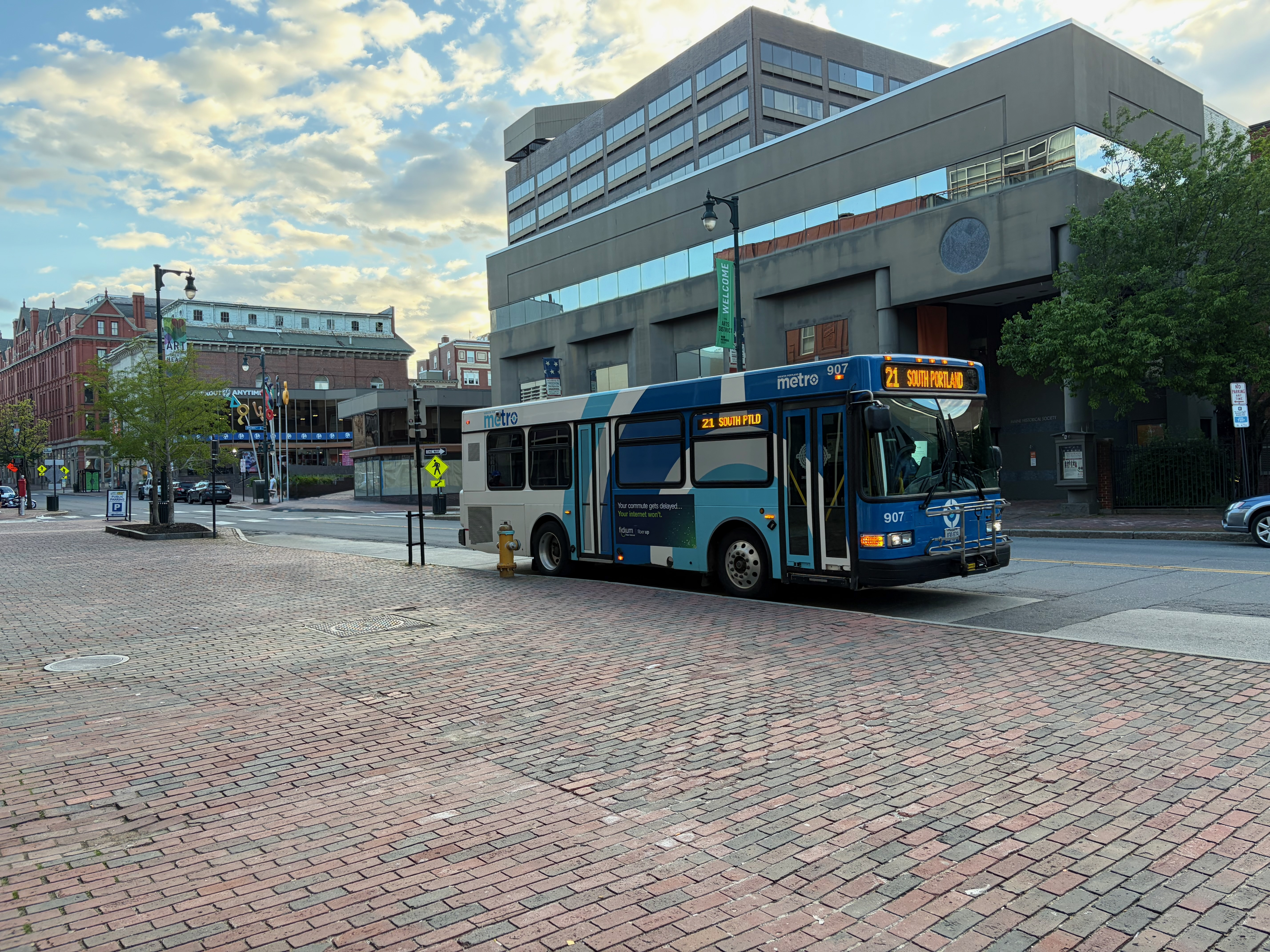
A Greater Portland Metro bus running route 21 on Congress Street

Greater Portland Metro's route 1 (Congress Street), 7 (Falmouth Flyer), 8 (Peninsula Loop), 9A (North Deering via Stevens Avenue), 9B (North Deering via Washington Avenue), 21 and the BREEZ, and Biddeford Saco Old Orchard Beach Transit's route 60 serve Congress Street.

== See also ==
- Portland Railroad Company
