= Joseph Barbour House =

Historic house in Portland, Maine

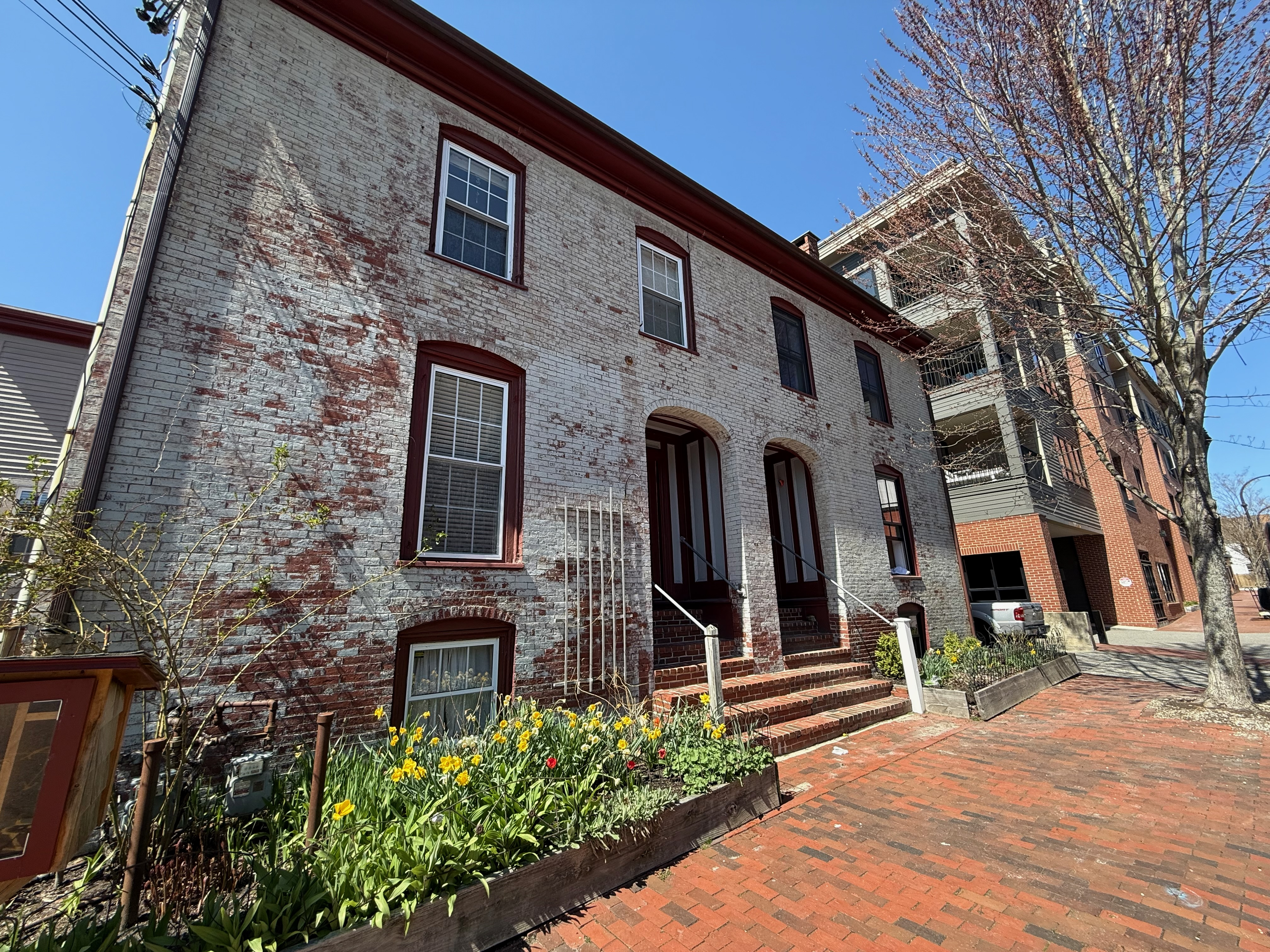
- The building in 2025
- Interactive map of the Joseph Barbour House area

General information
- Architectural style: Federal
- Location: Portland, Maine, U.S., 123–125 Newbury Street
- Coordinates: 43.66121°N 70.25031°W
- Completed: 1846 (180 years ago)

Technical details
- Floor count: 2.5

The Joseph Barbour House is a historic building in Portland, Maine, United States. Standing at 123–125 Newbury Street, in the India Street Historic District, the building was completed in 1846. Designed in the Federal style, the building survived Portland's fire of 1866 and is now recognized as being architecturally significant.

Joseph Barbour fought in the American Revolutionary War and the War of 1812. He died in 1854, aged 78. He was interred in Portland's Eastern Cemetery.
