= Reuben Merrill =

American merchant sea captain

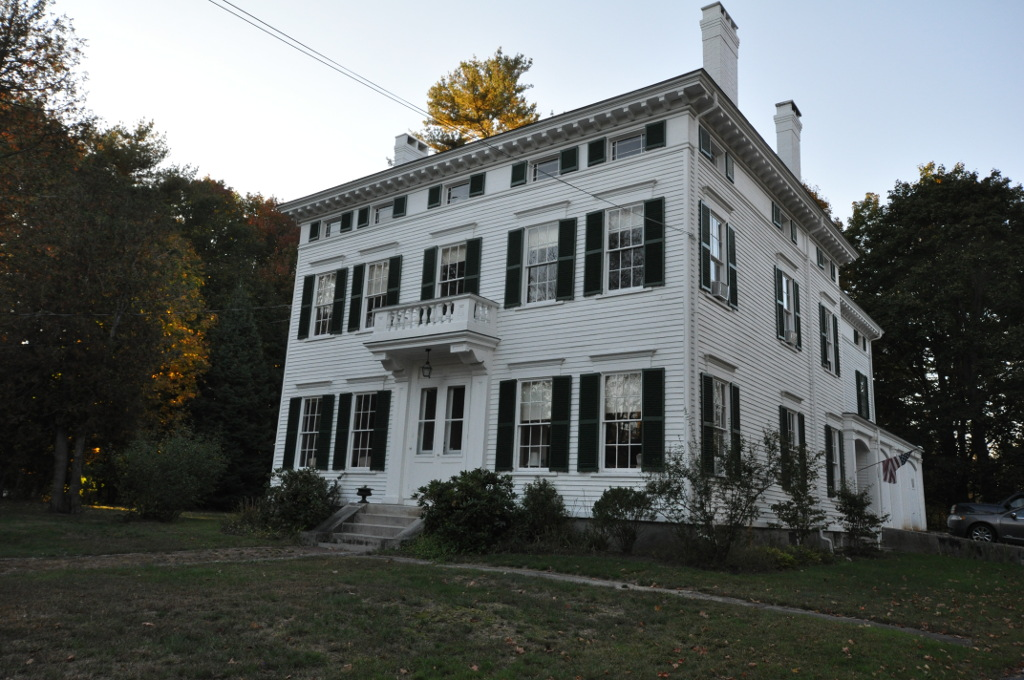
- The Captain Reuben Merrill House, 233 West Main Street, Yarmouth, Maine
- Born: December 2, 1818; Cumberland, Maine, U.S.
- Died: June 16, 1875 (aged 56); Farallon Islands, California, U.S.
- Occupation: Sea captain
- Spouse: Hannah Elizabeth Blanchard (1846–1875; his death)

Reuben Merrill (December 2, 1818 – June 16, 1875) was an American merchant sea captain. A native of Cumberland, Maine, he lived the latter part of his life in nearby Yarmouth. His house there, now known as the Captain Reuben Merrill House, was placed on the National Register of Historic Places in 1974.

== Early life ==
Reuben Merrill was born on December 2, 1818, in Cumberland, Maine.

== Career ==
Merrill was a leading mid-19th-century sea captain. After going to sea in his youth, he gained experience enough to become a master mariner. He was captain of the merchant ships Cumberland, Yarmouth, Esther and Champlain.

=== Champlain ===
Merrill's ship, Champlain, was built for W. H. Kinsman & Company in East Boston, Massachusetts, in 1874 by Campbell & Brooks. It registered 1,473 t (1,450 long tons; 1,624 short tons). Its builders "firmly believed that she would prove to be the fastest vessel that ever wore canvas". While at the dock, Merrill noticed three martingales and guessed, correctly, that the largest of them was bound for his vessel. Believing it was too small for Champlain, he requested a larger version. One was, indeed, made larger and heavier to suit Merrill.

== Personal life ==
On October 1, 1846, Merrill married Hannah Elizabeth Blanchard, with whom he had four children: Elizabeth (died in infancy in 1847), Osborne, Eva and Ferdinand.

In the 1850s, when Merrill's seafaring career was its peak, he commissioned noted Portland architect Thomas J. Sparrow, to build him a home. The result was the building at today's 233 West Main Street, completed in 1858. (The home's address at the time of its listing was 97 West Main Street.)

== Death ==
Merrill died on June 16, 1875, aged 56, when he was knocked overboard from his ship, Champlain, while shipwrecking in the Farallon Islands, California, off San Francisco, in dense fog. He had made sure that his crew was safely aboard the lifeboat, and as he was preparing to join them, he was struck by the martingale that he had personally requested by the ship's builders the previous year. The ship was near the end of its voyage from New York to the California coast. He drowned, aged 56, and neither his body nor the cargo ($210,000 in value) were ever recovered. He has an epitaph on his wife's headstone in Yarmouth's Riverside Cemetery. She died the year following her husband's death.

His eldest son and the ship's first mate, 26-year-old Osborne, witnessed his father's death. He lived until 1929, but did not go to sea again. He is also interred in Yarmouth's Riverside Cemetery.
