= Longfellow Square =

Square in Portland, Maine

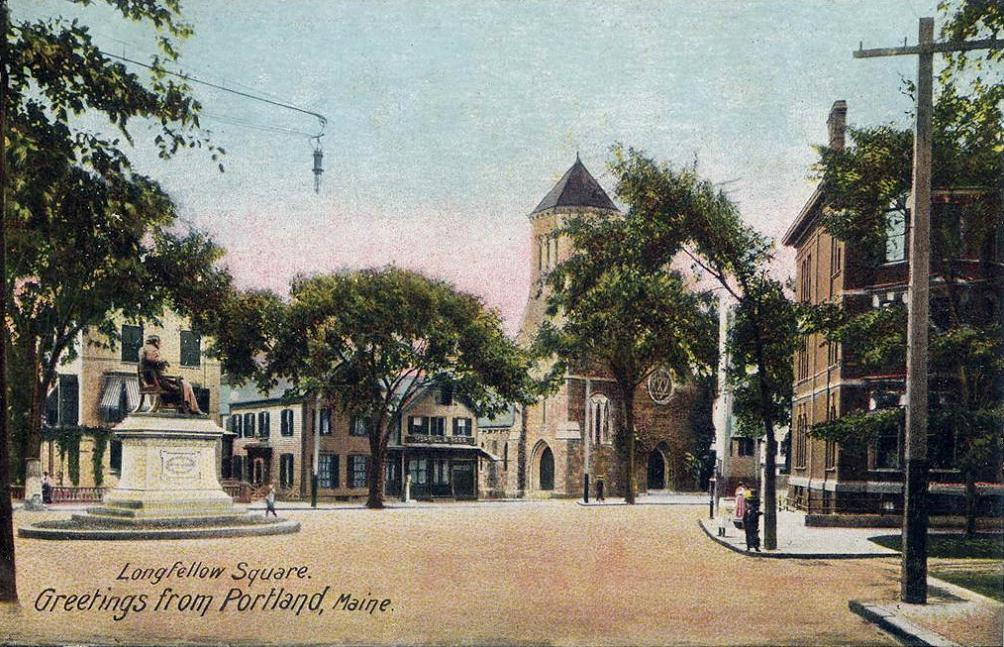
- Longfellow Square seen in a postcard, 1906
- Interactive map of Longfellow Square
- Maintained by: City of Portland
- Location: Portland, Maine, U.S.
- Coordinates: 43.6529873°N 70.2668522°W
- North: Congress Street
- South: State Street
- West: State Street

Longfellow Square is a public square in Portland, Maine, United States. Named for the poet Henry Wadsworth Longfellow, it is one of the three main squares on the city's Congress Street — the others being Congress Square and Monument Square, both located a short distance to the northeast. A monument to the poet, erected in 1888, stands in the center of the square, with the seated subject looking east.

The square is bounded by Congress Street to the north and State Street (which intersects Congress Street) to the west and south. Adjacent to the square is One Longfellow Square, a small performing-arts center.

== See also ==
- Portland Railroad Company
