= Deacon John Bailey House =

Historic house in Portland, Maine

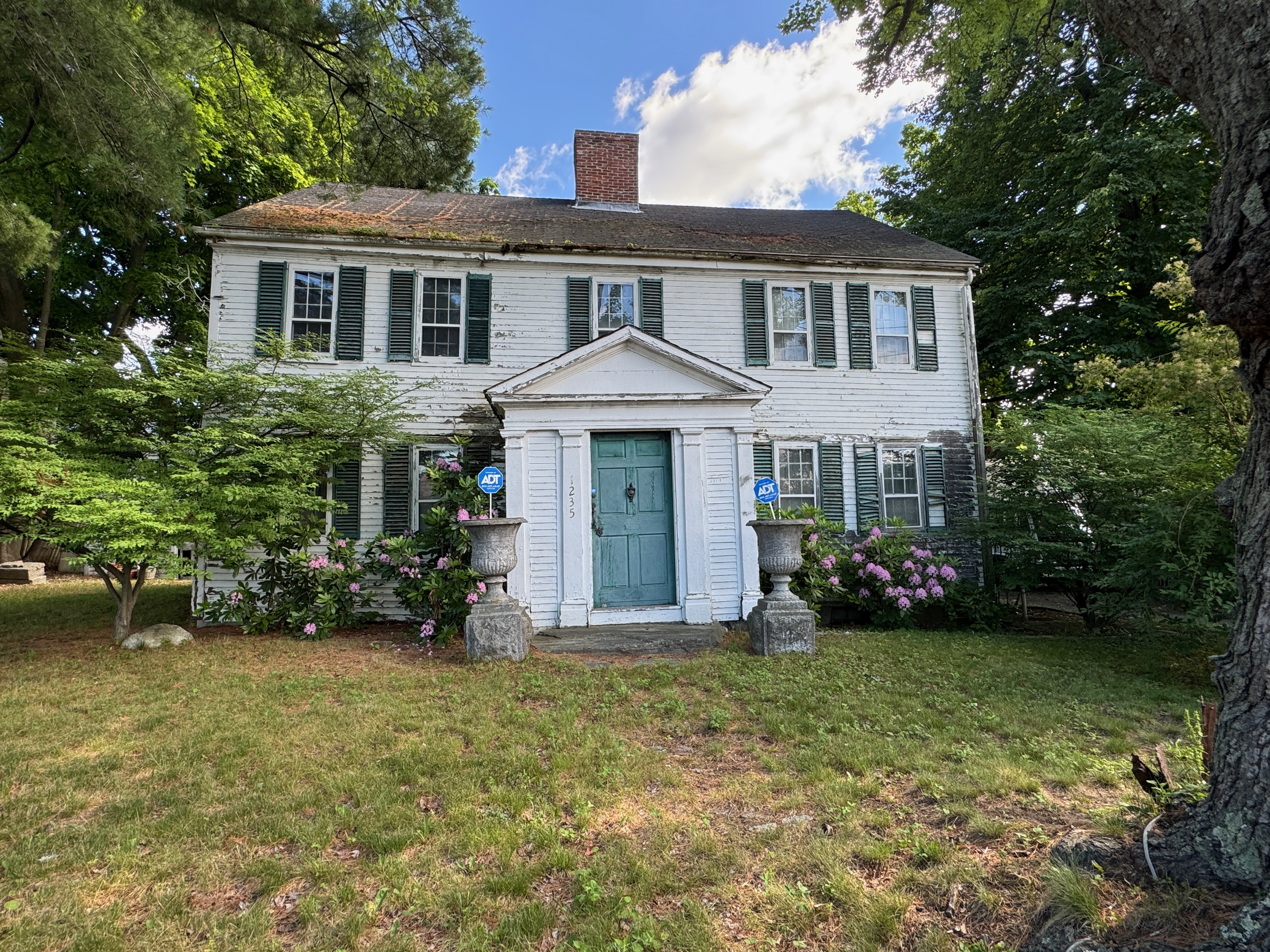
- The home pictured in 2024
- Interactive map of the Deacon John Bailey House area

General information
- Location: Portland, Maine, U.S., 1235 Congress Street
- Coordinates: 43.65770°N 70.29028°W
- Construction started: 1730
- Completed: 1756 (270 years ago)

Technical details
- Floor count: 2

Deacon John Bailey House is a residential building in Portland, Maine, United States. The home, which is located at 1235 Congress Street, was built between 1730 and 1756, when the city was part of the Province of Massachusetts Bay. Greater Portland Landmarks, a preservation group, calls it "one of the most important Pre-Revolutionary War-era houses in the city." It is believed that the bricks for the home's floor and hearth were fired on-site.

Originally a one-storey property, a second level was added by John Bailey's son, Benjamin, in 1807. In 1899, the property's location, on the northern side of Congress Street (then at number 1175), was given as being "between Libby's Corner and Bradley's Corner." It was occupied at the time by Helen M. Bailey, great-granddaughter of John and sister of previous owner, Captain Francis H. Bailey. After John's death, the home passed to son Benjamin, then to grandson Jeremiah.

It is one of the few buildings to have survived the 1775 burning of Falmouth and the great fire of 1866.

The Historic American Building Survey surveyed the building in 1936.

As of 2024, the property is owned by Heller Washam Antiques.

== John Bailey ==
John Bailey was born in Newbury, Province of Massachusetts Bay, on March 10, 1701, to Deacon John Bailey Sr. and Mary Bartlett. He was one of their three children, the others being son Joseph and daughter Mary.

Bailey was living in Newbury with his first wife, Rachel Leadiary, when his first child was born, and living in Marblehead when his second was born.

In 1727, he was admitted as a citizen of Falmouth, Province of Massachusetts Bay (now Portland, Maine).

Bailey married, for a second time, to Jane Curtis, widow of John Curtis, in Gorham on September 28, 1741. They had one child, son Benjamin, who was born in 1746.

He became the clerk of Stroudwater parish in 1764, and remained in the role until his death.

Bailey died on August 26, 1770, aged 69, and it is believed he was buried on the "southerly side of Mitchell's Hill, Deering" (beside Brighton Avenue) in a brick tomb built by his son. He was survived by his wife and son.
