= First Baptist Church (Portland, Maine) =

Historic church in Maine, United States

- Formerly listed on the U.S. National Register of Historic Places
- Location within Maine
- Location: 353 Congress Street, Portland, Maine
- Coordinates: 43°39′37″N 70°15′20″W
- Area: 1 acre (0.40 ha)
- Built: 1867
- Architect: Levi Newcomb (original building)
- Architectural style: Romanesque, Norman Gothic
- NRHP reference No.: 78000170

Significant dates
- Added to NRHP: January 31, 1978
- Removed from NRHP: July 14, 2015

The First Baptist Church of Portland was a stone church built on Congress Street following the Great Fire of 1866. It was built in the Romanesque Revival style and was listed on the National Register of Historic Places in 1978. It was demolished in 1987 and delisted from the National Register soon after.

== See also ==
- National Register of Historic Places listings in Portland, Maine
