= Maine Charitable Mechanic Association =

Nonprofit organization in Portland, Maine

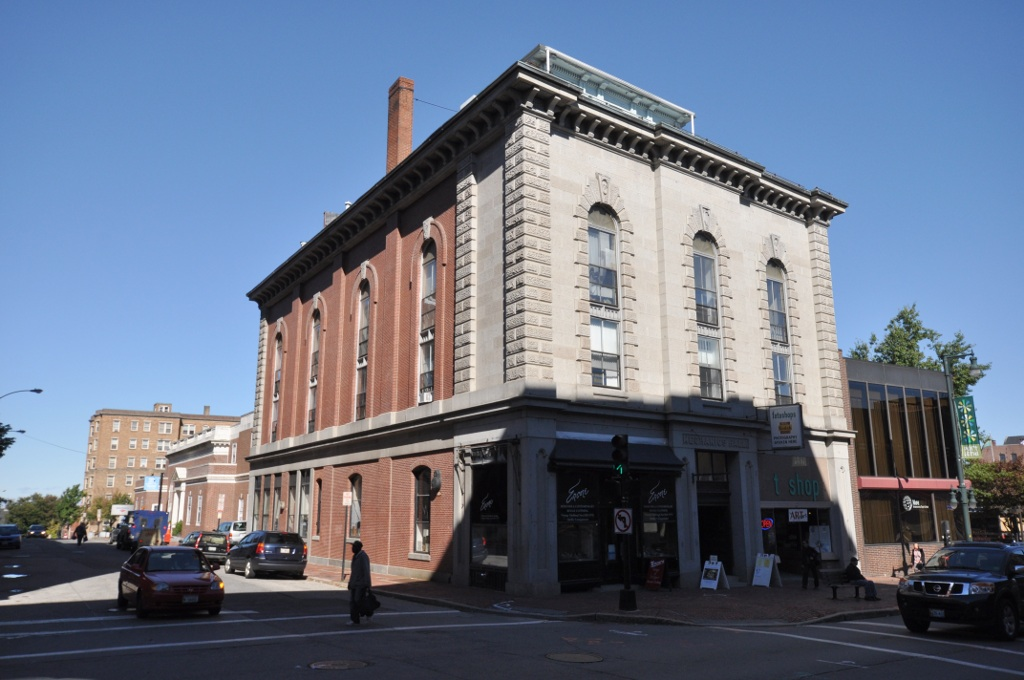
Mechanics' Hall, home of MCMA since 1859

The Maine Charitable Mechanic Association is a private non-profit organization located in Portland, Maine, United States. Founded in 1815, it has since 1859 been headquartered at Mechanics' Hall, 519 Congress Street, in the center of Portland. The library's hours are Tuesday through Thursday from 10:00 a.m. to 4:00 p.m.

== Founding ==
The MCMA was founded in 1815 as a way for local tradesmen to pool their resources, better their educations, and improve the quality of their work. Like many similar organizations that emerged in this period, the association aimed to help workers make the transition from an agrarian economy to an industrial economy. The association sponsored education for apprentices who worked as carpenters, masons, shipbuilders, jewelers, ironworkers, watchmakers, riggers, instrument makers, glass workers and more. The association's charter also declared that money would be set aside for "relieving the distress of unfortunate mechanics and their families."

== History ==
The MCMA opened its library in 1820. The library was housed in several locations around Portland until the erection in 1859 of Mechanics' Hall, built by members of the organization for their own use. The hall was designed by Thomas J. Sparrow, the first professional architect in Portland. In the late 1800s, famed local architect John Calvin Stevens designed the Mechanics' Hall ballroom. Mechanics' Hall was in 1973 added to the National Register of Historic Places.

The association flourished in the 19th century. It hosted many events, including musical performances and dances. Lectures were an especially popular draw for the organization; speakers like John Neal expounded on such topics as anatomy, physiology, natural philosophy, and modes of heating.

The MCMA also held several fairs and exhibitions to showcase the work of its members. Perhaps the grandest of these took place in 1854, when the association was not only allowed to use all the unused space in Portland City Hall, but raised a two-story building across the street and filled it with exhibits.

Mechanics' Hall was on occasion used for governmental purposes. In 1861, the MCMA offered the use of Mechanics' Hall as a mustering station for soldiers on their way to fight in the Civil War. After a terrible fire destroyed much of Portland in 1866, Mechanics' Hall served for a time as City Hall.

In 1875, the MCMA began to offer free classes in mechanical drawing, a practice it would continue until 1983. John Calvin Stevens was among the instructors.

Membership in the Maine Charitable Mechanic Association dwindled through the 20th and early 21st century as did the scope of its activities. However, the association is now enjoying a renaissance with many new members and enlivened creative programming. Today, MCMA has about four hundred members. It continues to operate its library at Mechanics' Hall, which offers a slate of lectures, book groups, and other events of artistic and historical interest. Its collection contains over 30,000 volumes that include both general interests and specialized collections. It is one of the few membership libraries still active in the United States, and one of the few Mechanics' Institutes remaining in the western hemisphere.

== See also ==
- Mechanics' Institutes
- Subscription library
