= Lancaster Block (Portland, Maine) =

- U.S. National Register of Historic Places
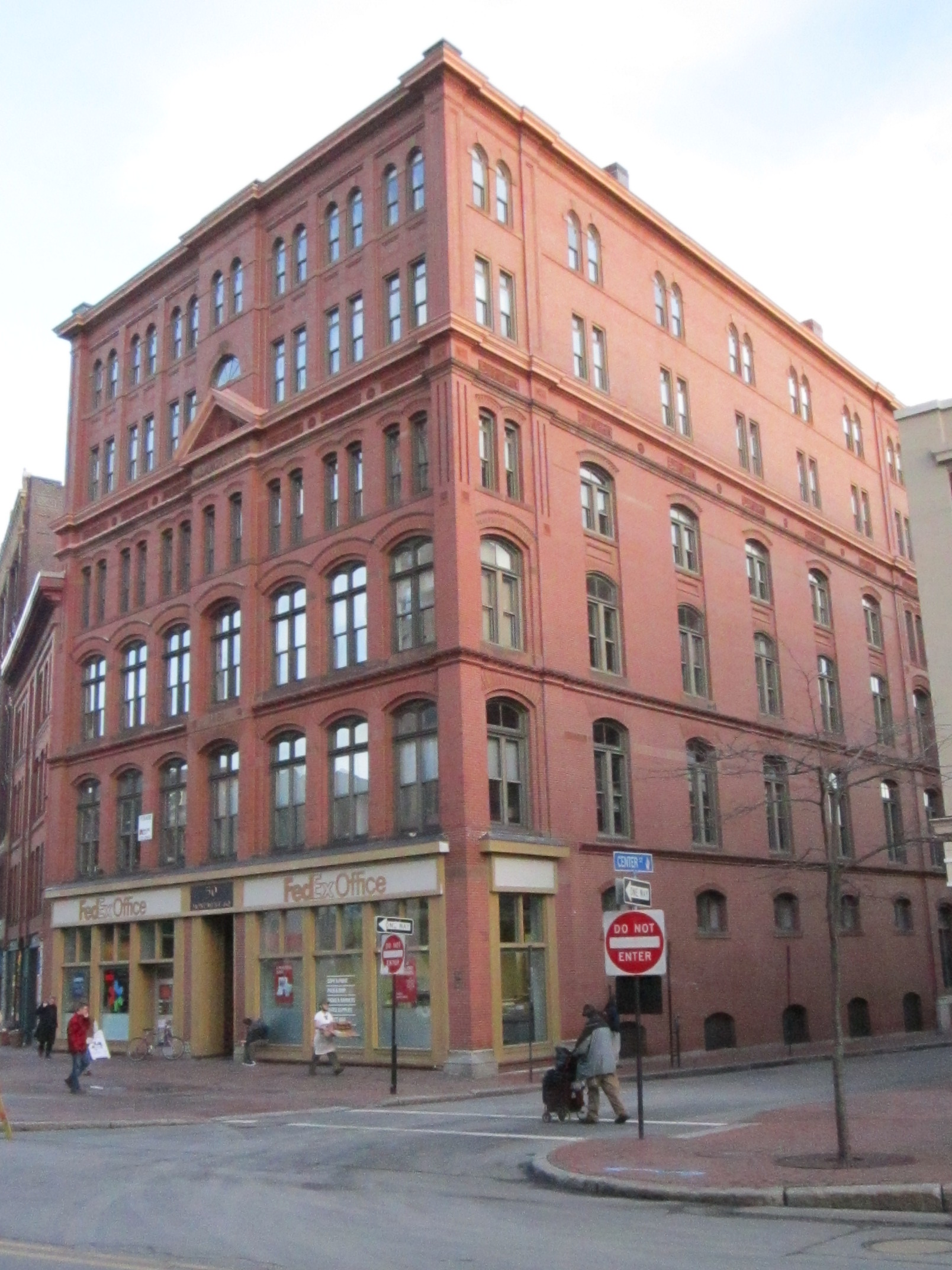
- The Lancaster Block in November 2011.

- Location within Maine Location within the United States
- Location: 50 Monument Square, Portland, Maine
- Coordinates: 43°39′25″N 70°15′35″W
- Area: 0.5 acres (0.20 ha)
- Built: 1881; rebuilt in 1908
- Architect: Stevens, John Calvin, Fassett, Francis H.
- Architectural style: Romanesque
- NRHP reference No.: 82000745
- Added to NRHP: September 29, 1982

The Lancaster Block is an historic commercial building in downtown Portland, Maine. Located at 50 Monument Square, it is a fine local example of commercial Romanesque Revival architecture. It was built in 1881 and enlarged in 1908; it is named for Lancaster, New Hampshire, the hometown of its builder, J. B. Brown. it was listed on the National Register of Historic Places in 1982.

== Description and history ==
The Lancaster Block is located on the south side of Monument Square in central Portland, at the southeast corner of Center and Congress Streets, anchoring the southwestern end of the square. It is a six-story masonry structure, built mostly out of red brick, with terra cotta and granite trim elements. The main facade faces north, toward Congress Street and the square, and is seven bays wide, with a center building entrance flanked by storefronts of wood and glass. Windows on the second and third floors are paired sash, set in segmented-arch openings, while on the fourth floor the individual sashes, still two per bay, are set in individual arched openings. A band of terra cotta paneling (the former building cornice) separates the fourth and fifth floors, with a gable above the central bay. Fifth-floor windows are set in rectangular openings, while those on the top floor are set in rounded-arch openings, two per bay.

The building was designed by the partnership of John Calvin Stevens and Francis Fassett, and was built in 1881 for developer John B. Brown, then one of the city's leading businessmen. Originally only four stories were built; the upper two floors, which are stylistically sympathetic to the original, were added in 1908, their design credited to Fassett's firm.

== See also ==
- National Register of Historic Places listings in Portland, Maine
