= Mechanics' Hall (Portland, Maine) =

- U.S. National Register of Historic Places
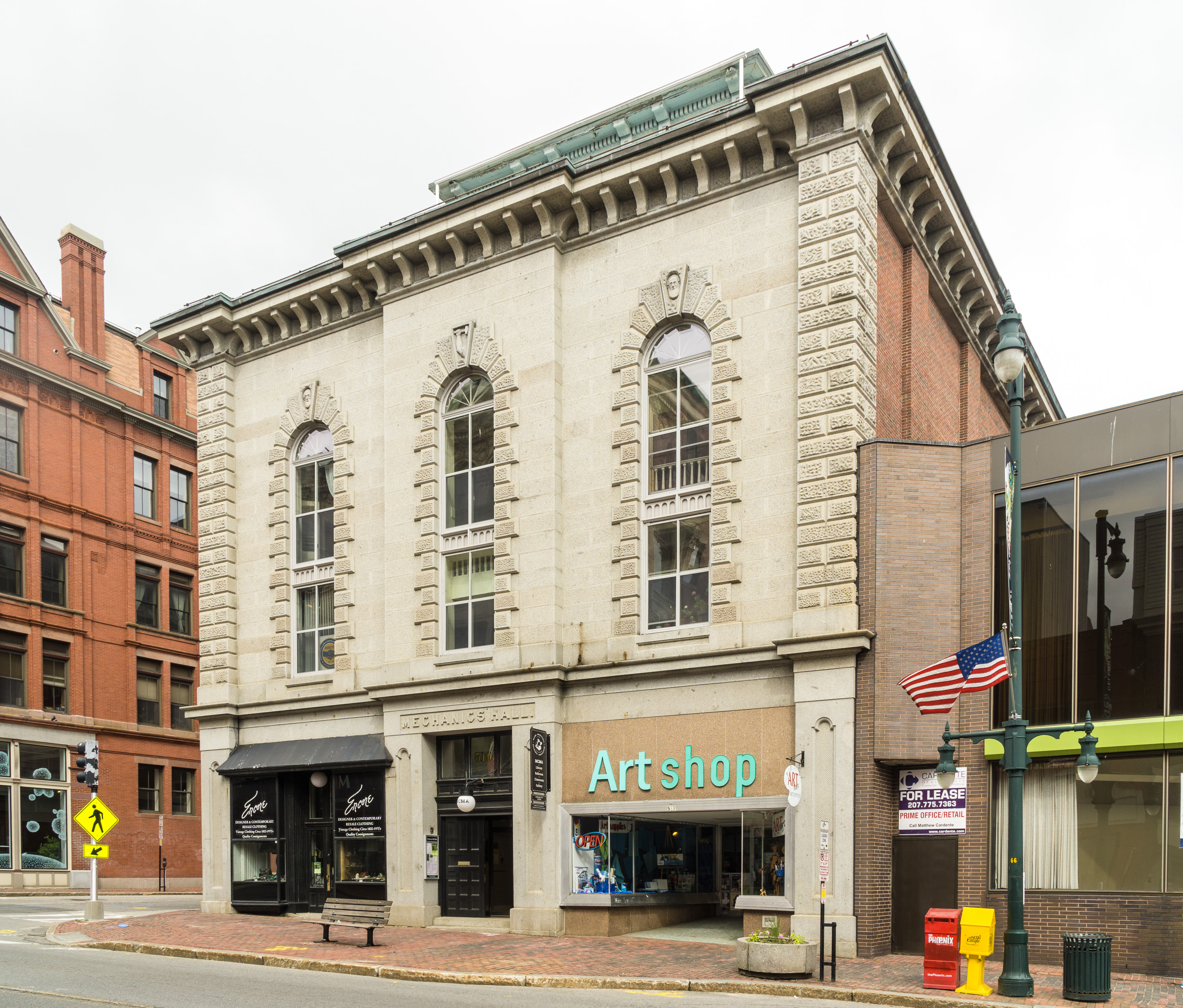
- Front of Mechanics' Hall

- Location within Maine Location within the United States
- Location: 519 Congress Street, Portland, Maine
- Coordinates: 43°39′23″N 70°15′43″W
- Built: 1857–1859
- Architect: Thomas J. Sparrow
- Architectural style: Italianate
- NRHP reference No.: 73000118
- Added to NRHP: 1973

Mechanics' Hall is a historic building and meeting space at 519 Congress Street in downtown Portland, Maine. It was listed on the National Register of Historic Places (NRHP) in 1973 and additional NRHP documentation asserting national significance of the building was approved in 2022. Built in 1857–1859 by and for the members of the Maine Charitable Mechanic Association, it is a well-preserved example of Italianate architecture executed in brick and stone, and a landmark of Portland's downtown business and arts district. The building, still owned by MCMA, houses the association's library. The Maine Charitable Mechanic Association was founded in 1815 as a social organization that promoted and supported the skilled trades and their practitioners. Its original members were master craftspeople and entrepreneurs (then called mechanics) and their apprentices.

== Description ==
Mechanics' Hall is located on the north side of Congress Street in downtown Portland, at the northeast corner with Casco Street. It is a two-story masonry structure, appearing three stories in height owing to an extremely tall (33-foot (10 m)) second floor. It is covered by a truncated hip roof. Its front facade is finished in granite, while its sides and rear are finished in brick beyond the first bay. The front facade has a pair of commercial storefronts flanking the main building entrance, each storefront having a central recessed entrance. The main entrance is framed by paneled stone posts topped by a lintel on which the building name is incised. The upper-level windows are set in tall openings with rounded-arch tops and quoining of rough textured stone. A bracketed cornice projects along the street-facing sides. The interior of the building has hall on the ground floor with access from both Congress and Casco Streets, and space for the association's library. The upper floor, which originally housed a large meeting space, has been divided into two floors.

The Maine Charitable Mechanical Association (MCMA) was formed in 1815 as a charitable and educational association for workers in the "mechanical arts". It sponsored, exhibitions, trade fairs, and lectures on a variety of topics, and accumulated a library.

== History ==
This building was constructed in 1857-59, by members of the association, to a design by Thomas J. Sparrow, a native of Portland who was also an association member. It is one of only three designs by Sparrow known to survive.

The building was constructed from Biddeford granite and stone. The building was dedicated on February 23, 1859. In 1861 it was used by troops heading to fight the Civil War. The building survived the Great Fire of 1866 and was used afterward for municipal services.

The upper level interior space was modified in 1890 to plans drawn up by noted Portland architect John Calvin Stevens, converting it to office space and a larger library space.

It was documented by the Historic American Buildings Survey (HABS) in 1965, 1969 and/or 1971.

It was listed on the National Register of Historic Places in 1973.

The building underwent interior and exterior restoration in the 2010s. In March 2015 the refurbished ballroom was opened to the public for the first time in over fifty years. Refurbishment of the cast iron details at the building's base were recognized with a preservation award in 2016.

Additional documentation for the National Register of Historic Places listing was approved in 2022, which upgraded assessment of the building's importance to be of national significance, rather than the local significance assessed in the original 1973 listing.

== See also ==
- National Register of Historic Places listings in Portland, Maine
