= Henry Wadsworth Longfellow Memorial =

Statue in Washington, D.C., U.S.

- U.S. National Register of Historic Places
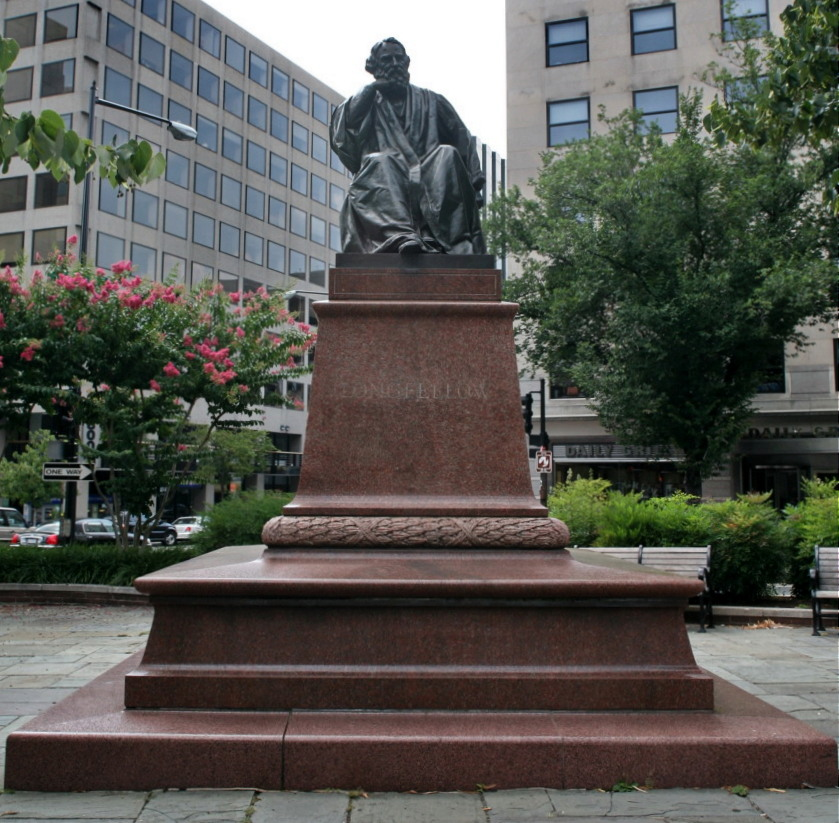
- The statue in 2008

- Location within the District of Columbia Location within the United States
- Location: M Street and Connecticut Avenue, N.W. Washington, D.C.
- Coordinates: 38°54′21″N 77°2′30″W
- Area: less than one acre
- Built: 1909
- Built by: William Couper
- Architectural style: Naturalism
- MPS: Memorials in Washington, D.C.
- NRHP reference No.: 07001056
- Added to NRHP: October 11, 2007

Henry Wadsworth Longfellow is a bronze statue, by William Couper, and Thomas Ball. The statue depicts American poet Henry Wadsworth Longfellow. It is located at the intersection of M Street and Connecticut Avenue, N.W. Washington, D.C., and was dedicated on May 7, 1909.

== History ==
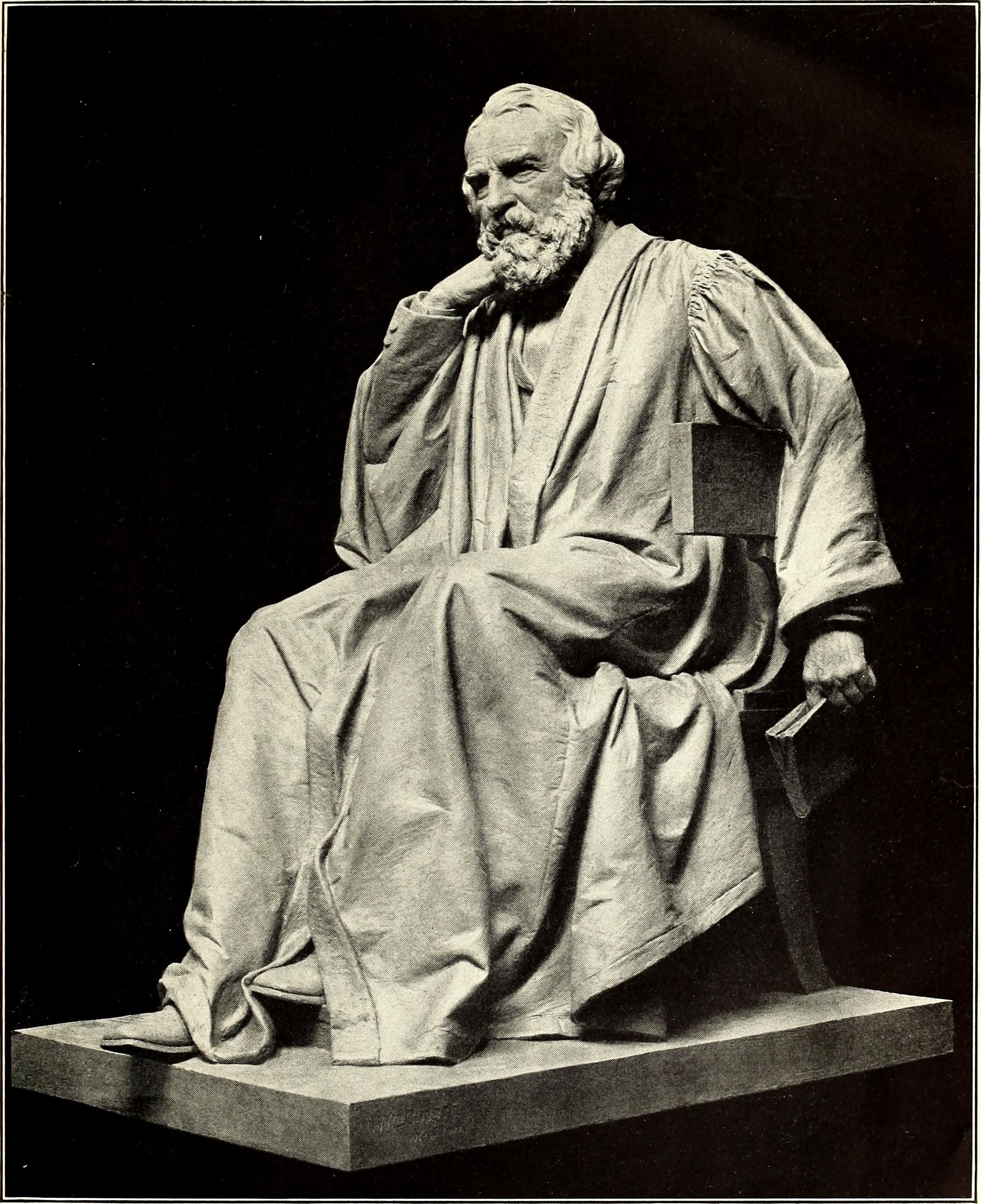
Sculptural Conception

After the death of Henry Wadsworth Longfellow in 1882, there were several plans to memorialize him. His bust was placed at Poets' Corner in Westminster Abbey in 1884 and a statue of the poet by Franklin Simmons was unveiled in his native town of Portland, Maine, at what became known as Longfellow Square. For the statue in Washington, an association was founded to raise money for the effort, ultimately earning $21,000 by subscribers. Additionally, Congress offered another $4,000 and the site. Members of the organization included Andrew Carnegie, Henry Cabot Lodge, Charles William Eliot, Edward Everett Hale, Julia Ward Howe, and Curtis Guild. Theodore Roosevelt served as Honorary Regent. It was unveiled in 1909 by the poet's granddaughter Erica Thorp in the presence of Chief Justice Melville Fuller and the United States Marine Band.

== See also ==
- List of public art in Washington, D.C., Ward 2
- Henry Wadsworth Longfellow Monument in Portland, Maine
