= Deering, Maine =

Deering
- Former city
- City of Deering
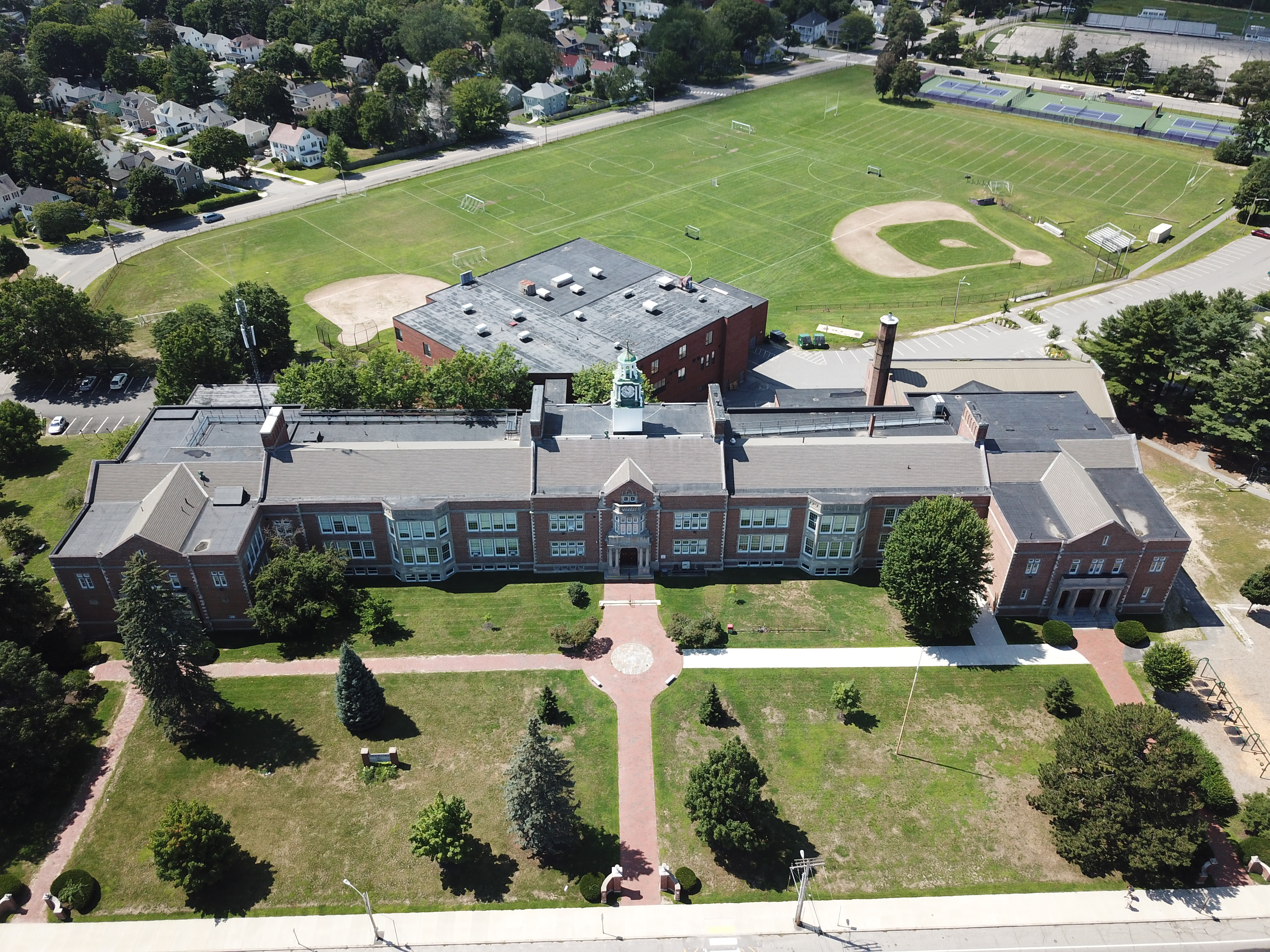
- Deering High School

- Location within Maine Location within the United States
- Coordinates: 43°40′18.7″N 70°17′45.3″W
- Country: United States
- State: Maine
- County: Cumberland
- Incorporated (town): 1871
- Incorporated (city): 1882
- Disincorporated (Annexed): 1889

Population (1890)
  - Total: 5,353
- Time zone: UTC-5 (Eastern (EST))
  - Summer (DST): UTC-4 (EDT)

Historical population
Census	Pop.	Note	%±
1880	4,324		—
1890	5,353		23.8%

Deering was a city in Cumberland County, Maine, United States which was incorporated in 1871 and annexed by the neighboring City of Portland in 1899. Until 1871, Deering was a part of Saccarappa, which also included what is now neighboring Westbrook. In that year, the towns split with little opposition. The 1880 United States census counted 4,324 residents of the newly formed town. In 1892, Deering was incorporated as a city. In 1899, Deering was annexed by Portland, becoming one of the northern neighborhoods of the city.

== Mitchell's Hill ==
Mitchell's Hill is a hill in the Deering Highlands neighborhood. At its summit, the hill stands around 140 feet (43 m) feet above sea level. It runs northeast-to-southwest, approximately from Woodfords Corner to Stevens Avenue. Brighton Avenue runs northwest-to-southeast through its mid-section.

A cemetery is believed to have existed on the southern side of the hill, for John Bailey (1701–1770), a deacon in what was then Falmouth, Province of Massachusetts Bay (Portland today), was buried there.

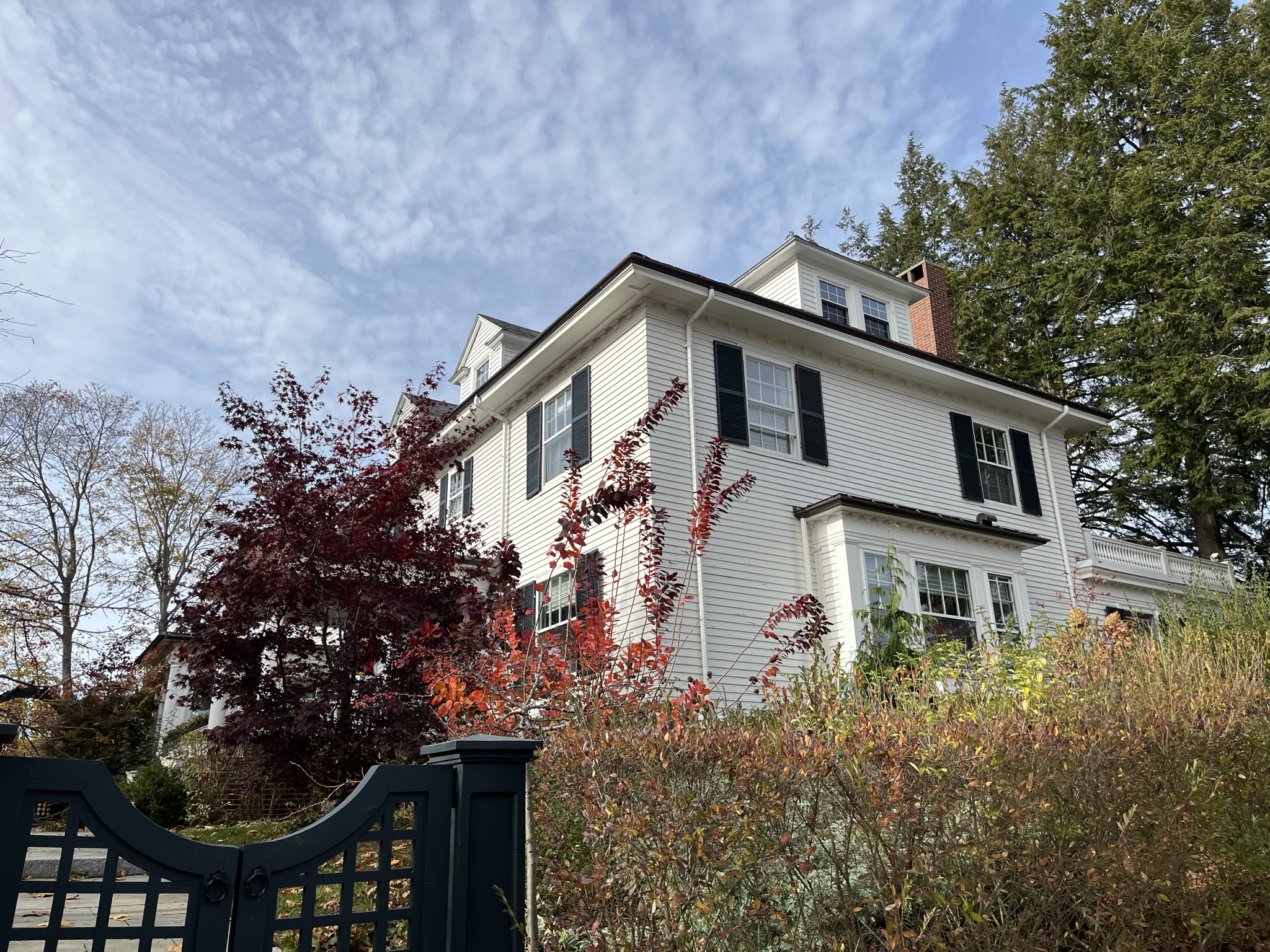
A house on Highland Street in Deering Highlands
