= Asa Hanson Block =

- U.S. National Register of Historic Places
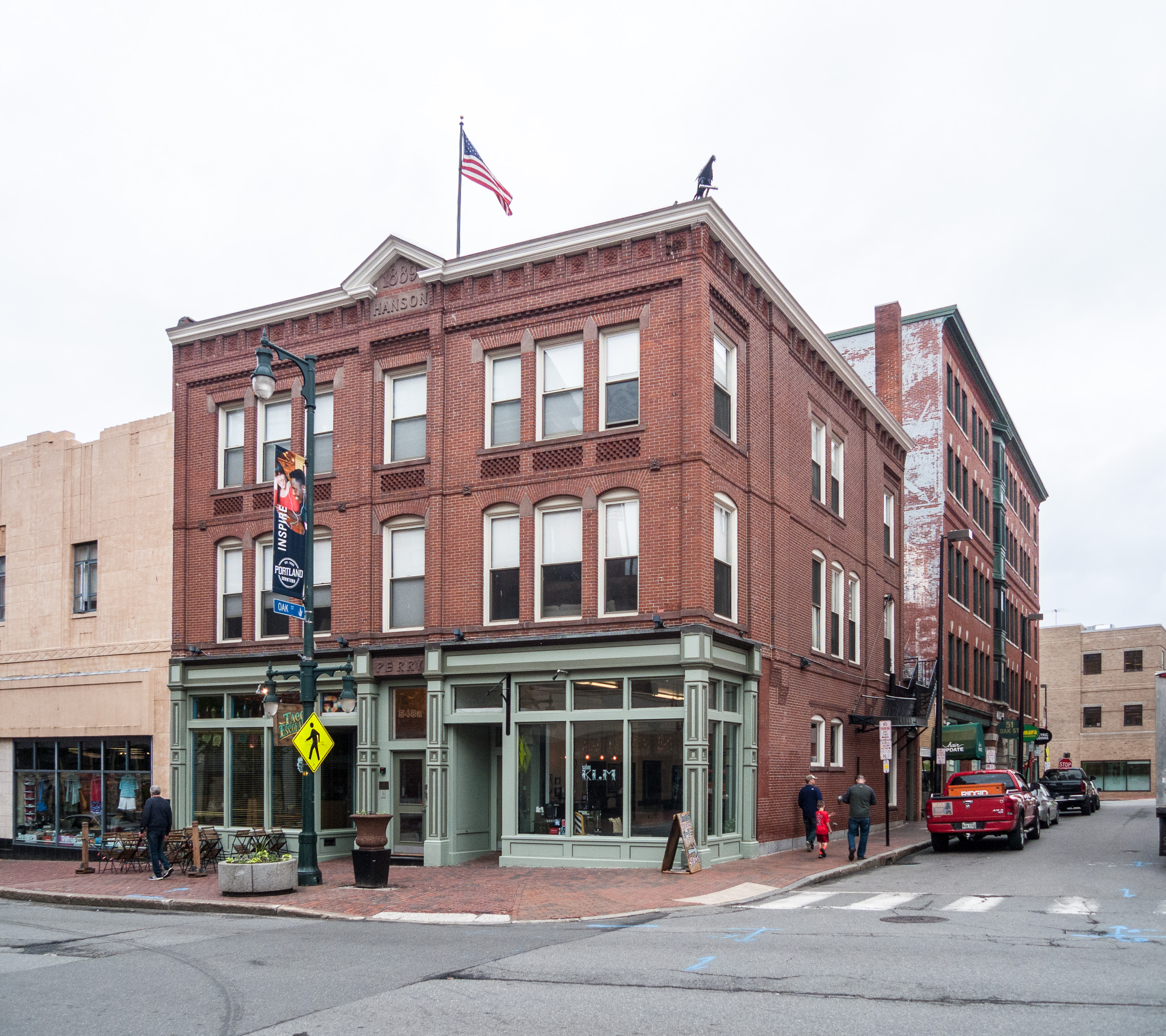
- The Asa Hanson Block in 2017

- Location within Maine Location within the United States
- Location: 548-550 Congress St., Portland, Maine
- Coordinates: 43°39′19″N 70°15′43″W
- Area: less than one acre
- Built: 1889 (137 years ago)
- Architect: Francis Fassett; Frederick A. Tompson
- Architectural style: Late Victorian
- NRHP reference No.: 01001418
- Added to NRHP: December 31, 2001

The Asa Hanson Block is a historic commercial building at 548-550 Congress Street in Downtown Portland, Maine. It was built in 1889, to a design by local architect Francis Fassett and in partnership with Frederick A. Tompson, and is one of a small number of surviving commercial designs by Fassett in the city. It was added to the National Register of Historic Places in 2001.

== Description and history ==
The Asa Hanson Block is located on the south side of Congress Street, Portland's main commercial thoroughfare, at the southeast corner with Oak Street. It is a three-story brick building, seven bays wide, with a low sloping flat roof. The roof is obscured by a projecting cornice that has a gable above the center bay. The ground floor has two storefronts flanking the main entrance, each with three large-panel windows and a recessed entrance, with articulating paneled metal posts. Second-floor windows are set in segmented-arch openings, with a brick stringcourse above. The third-floor windows are set in rectangular openings, with brickwork panels below. The upper bays are grouped in sets of three flanking the center bay, with pilasters between the groups rising to decorative brickwork banding below the cornice.

The block was built in 1889 to a design by Francis Fassett, a prolific architect who was much in demand after the 1866 great fire of Portland. Of eighteen commercial buildings he is known to have designed in the city, this is one of only seven that survives, and retains most of its exterior design. (The interior of the building has been repeatedly altered, and no longer has historical significance.) Asa Hanson, for whom it was nominally built, was an agent for J.B. Brown, a leading local industrialist. The name "Perry" appears in a panel on the building because it was built by Charles Perry, a real estate developer.

== See also ==
- National Register of Historic Places listings in Portland, Maine
