= Captain Reuben Merrill House =

Historic house in Maine, United States

- Capt. Reuben Merrill House
- U.S. National Register of Historic Places
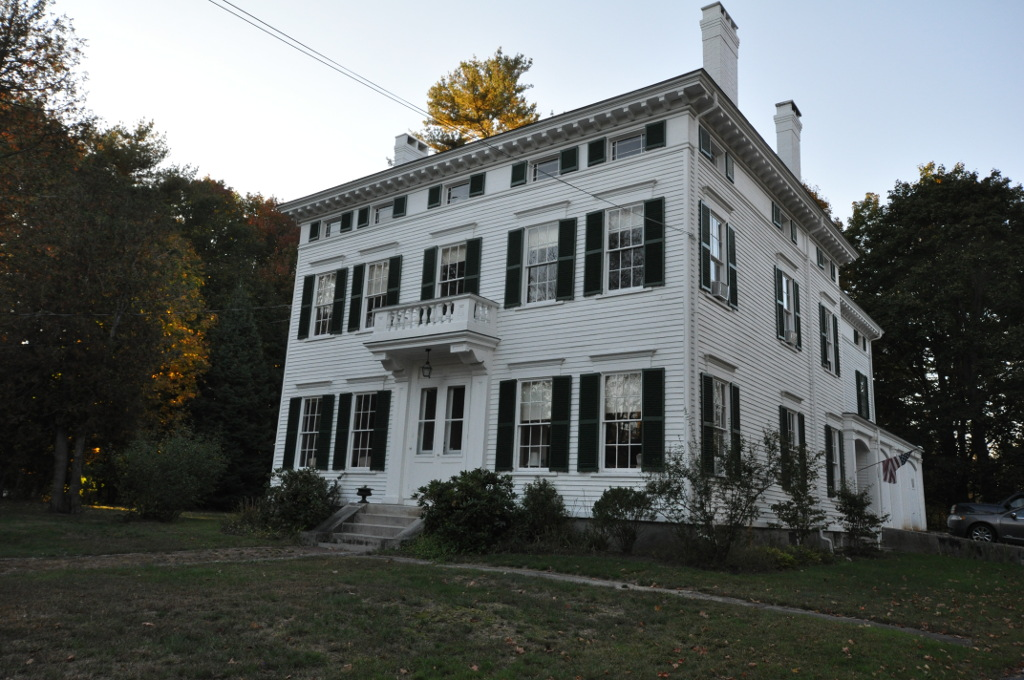

- Location within Maine Location within the United States
- Location: 233 West Main Street, Yarmouth, Maine
- Coordinates: 43°48′13.8″N 70°12′14.8″W
- Area: 1 acre (0.40 ha)
- Built: 1858
- Architectural style: Italianate
- NRHP reference No.: 74000313
- Added to NRHP: July 12, 1974

The Captain Reuben Merrill House is an historic house at 233 West Main Street in Yarmouth, Maine. Built in 1858, it is one of the town's largest and most elaborate 19th-century houses, and is one of three known surviving works of Portland architect Thomas J. Sparrow. It was placed on the National Register of Historic Places in 1974. It is now home to Maine Preservation, a statewide architectural preservation organization.

== Description and history ==
The Captain Reuben Merrill House is located on the north side of West Main Street (Maine State Route 115), just east of its junction with Newell Road. It is a large, three-story wood-frame structure, with a hip roof, and a three-story ell extending to the rear. It is finished in clapboard siding and rests on a granite foundation. The main facade is five bays wide, with a centered entrance that is sheltered by a hood that acts as a balcony for the second floor. First- and second-floor windows are rectangular sash, while the third floor has short, rectangular fixed windows.

The cast-iron fence at the street is a rare survivor of its age.

The house was built in 1858 for Reuben Merrill (1818–1875), a ship's captain who was a native of nearby Cumberland. It was designed by Thomas J. Sparrow, the first major architect originating from Portland, Maine, and was considered the finest home in Yarmouth. It was built by John Dunham, a local master builder, and was built at was then the outskirts of Yarmouth village.

Merrill died when was knocked overboard from his ship while off San Francisco in 1875. He drowned, aged about 57.

In 2011, the Merrill family leased the home to Maine Preservation, an historic preservation organization.

== See also ==
- National Register of Historic Places listings in Cumberland County, Maine
- Historical buildings and structures of Yarmouth, Maine
