= Maine Eye and Ear Infirmary =

- U.S. National Register of Historic Places
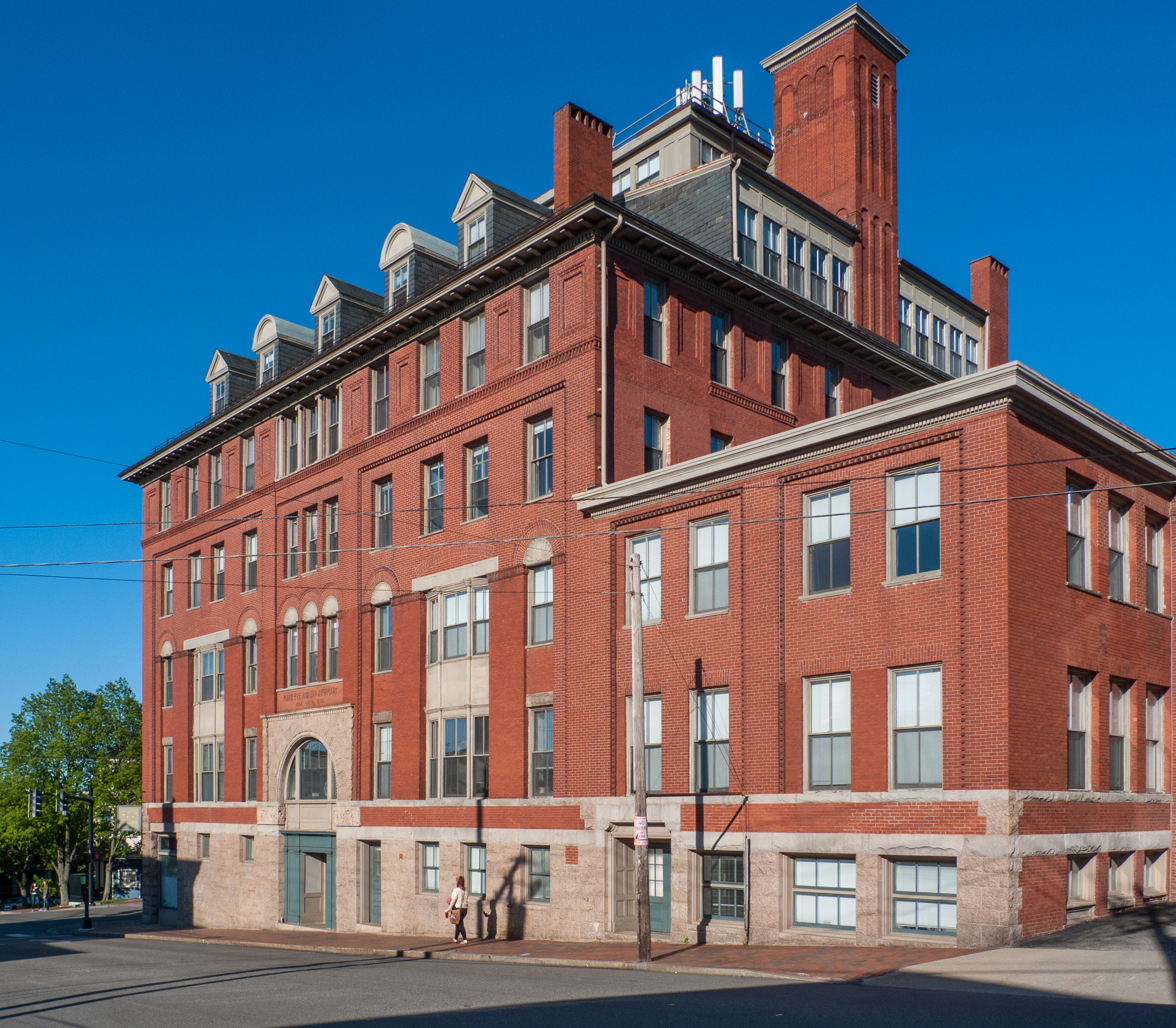
- Maine Eye and Ear Infirmary's western façade

- Location within Maine Location within the United States
- Location: 794-800 Congress St., Portland, Maine
- Coordinates: 43°39′13″N 70°16′24″W
- Area: 1 acre (0.40 ha)
- Built: 1891
- Architect: John Calvin Stevens; Et al.
- Architectural style: Romanesque, English Renaissance
- NRHP reference No.: 86002469
- Added to NRHP: September 25, 1986

The Maine Eye and Ear Infirmary is a historic medical facility that was located at 794-800 Congress Street in Portland, Maine. Also known as Holt Hall, the structure, designed by John Calvin Stevens, was redeveloped into a residential building in 1997, after standing dormant for nearly 10 years. The Maine Eye and Ear Infirmary was built in 1891. In 1951 the hospital merged with the Children's Hospital and Maine General Hospital to become Maine Medical Center. The facility was added to the National Register of Historic Places in 1986.

== Description and history ==
The former Maine Eye and Ear Infirmary building is located in Portland's West End, at the southeast corner of Congress and Bramhall Streets, just east of the main campus of the Maine Medical Center. It is a brick building, six stories tall, with stone trim and a dormered hip roof, and a three-story ell extending to the south. Its ground floor functionally appears as a raised basement, finished in quarry-cut stone. The main entrance is on Bramhall Street, set in a two-story round-arched opening, and there are four storefronts on the Congress Street side, with plate glass display windows and recessed entrances, set between stone piers.

The Maine Eye and Ear Infirmary was founded in 1886 by Dr. Erastus Eugene Holt, and was one of the first institutions of its type in the nation. This building was built for the infirmary in 1891 to a design by noted Portland architect John Calvin Stevens, and is an important transitional work of his, moving from the earlier Queen Anne and Romanesque styles toward the Colonial Revival. Stevens and his son John Howard Stevens designed large additions (not generally visible from the street) to the rear in 1916. Following the Infirmary's merger into the Maine Medical Center, it continued to be used for medical functions until 1980. It has since been converted to primarily residential use.

== See also ==
- National Register of Historic Places listings in Portland, Maine
