= St. Paul's Church and Rectory =

Historic church in Maine, United States

- U.S. National Register of Historic Places
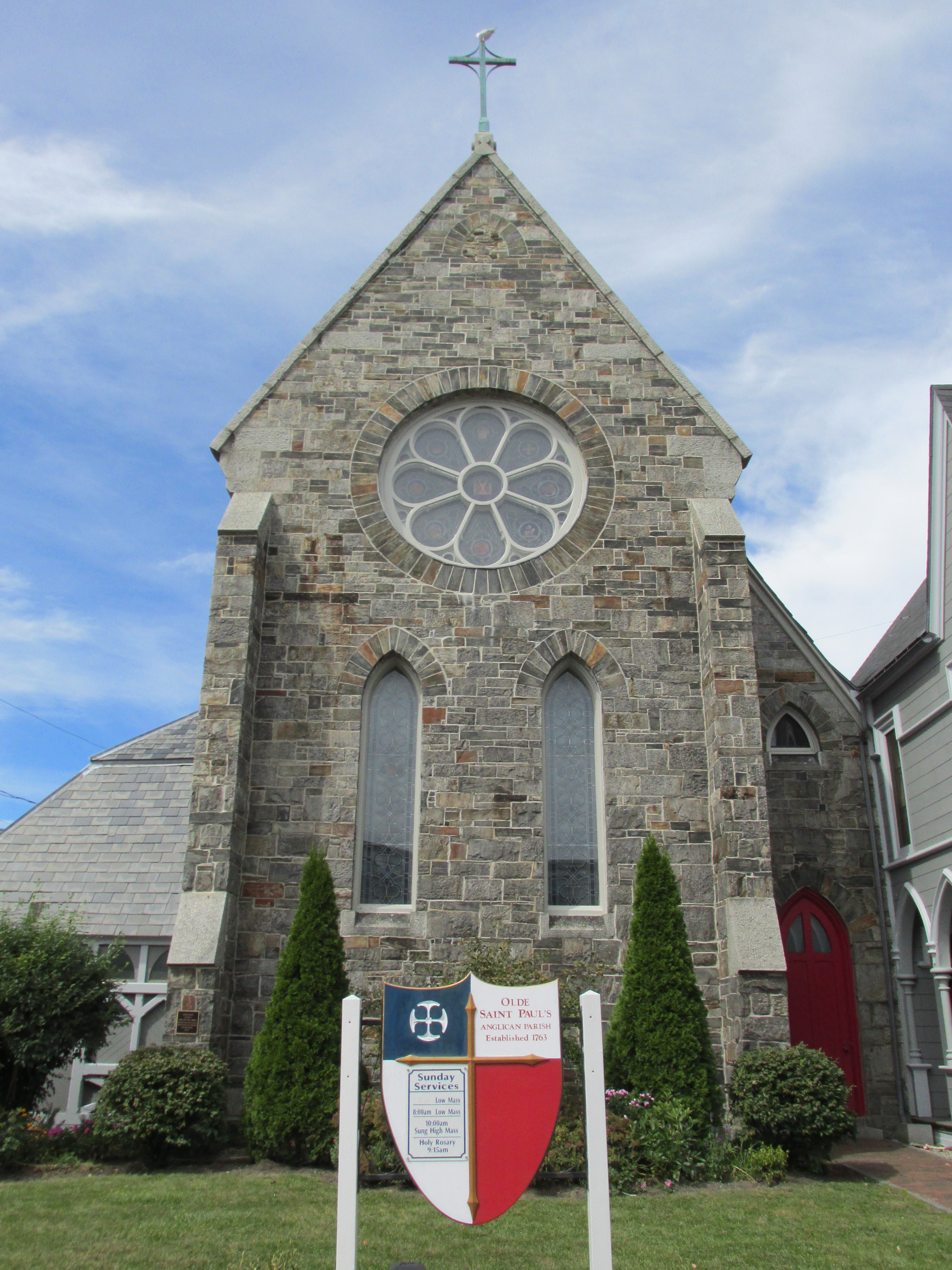
- St. Paul's Church

- Location within Maine Location within the United States
- Location: 279 Congress St., Portland, Maine
- Coordinates: 43°39′43″N 70°15′12″W
- Area: 0.5 acres (0.20 ha)
- Built: 1868
- Architect: George Browne Pelham
- Architectural style: Gothic Revival
- NRHP reference No.: 78000176
- Added to NRHP: December 22, 1978

St. Paul's Church and Rectory is an historic Episcopal church, now affiliated with the United Episcopal Church of North America, at 279 Congress Street in Portland, Maine. The present rector is the Rev. Andrew S. Faust. The church was formerly part of the Episcopal Diocese of Maine.

== Architecture and history ==
Built in 1868 for a newly established congregation, it is a fine local example of Gothic Revival architecture, designed by English architect George Browne Pelham. It was listed on the National Register of Historic Places in 1978. The church stands northeast of central Portland, at the northern corner of Locust Street and Congress Street. The church itself is set back from Congress Street, with the main entrance facing Locust, and the wood frame rectory set closer to Congress Street. The church is a rectangular stone structure, one story in height, with a steeply pitched gabled slate roof. Its sides and corners are buttressed, with narrow Gothic lancet-arch windows in between, and a rose window in the gable facing Congress Street. The back gable wall is finished in wooden clapboards, with a large three-sided stained glass window in the gable. The entrance is set in a large Gothic opening in a gabled projection.

The first Episcopal congregation in Portland was known as St. Paul's, but it was reorganized in 1839 and renamed St. Stephen's. The congregation for this church was organized in 1868, and the present church and rectory were completed the following year. They are both the design of English architect George Browne Pelham, who lived in Portland from 1868 to 1871, before moving to New York City.

== See also ==
- National Register of Historic Places listings in Portland, Maine
