= Green Elephant Vegetarian Bistro =

Restaurant in Portland, Maine, U.S.

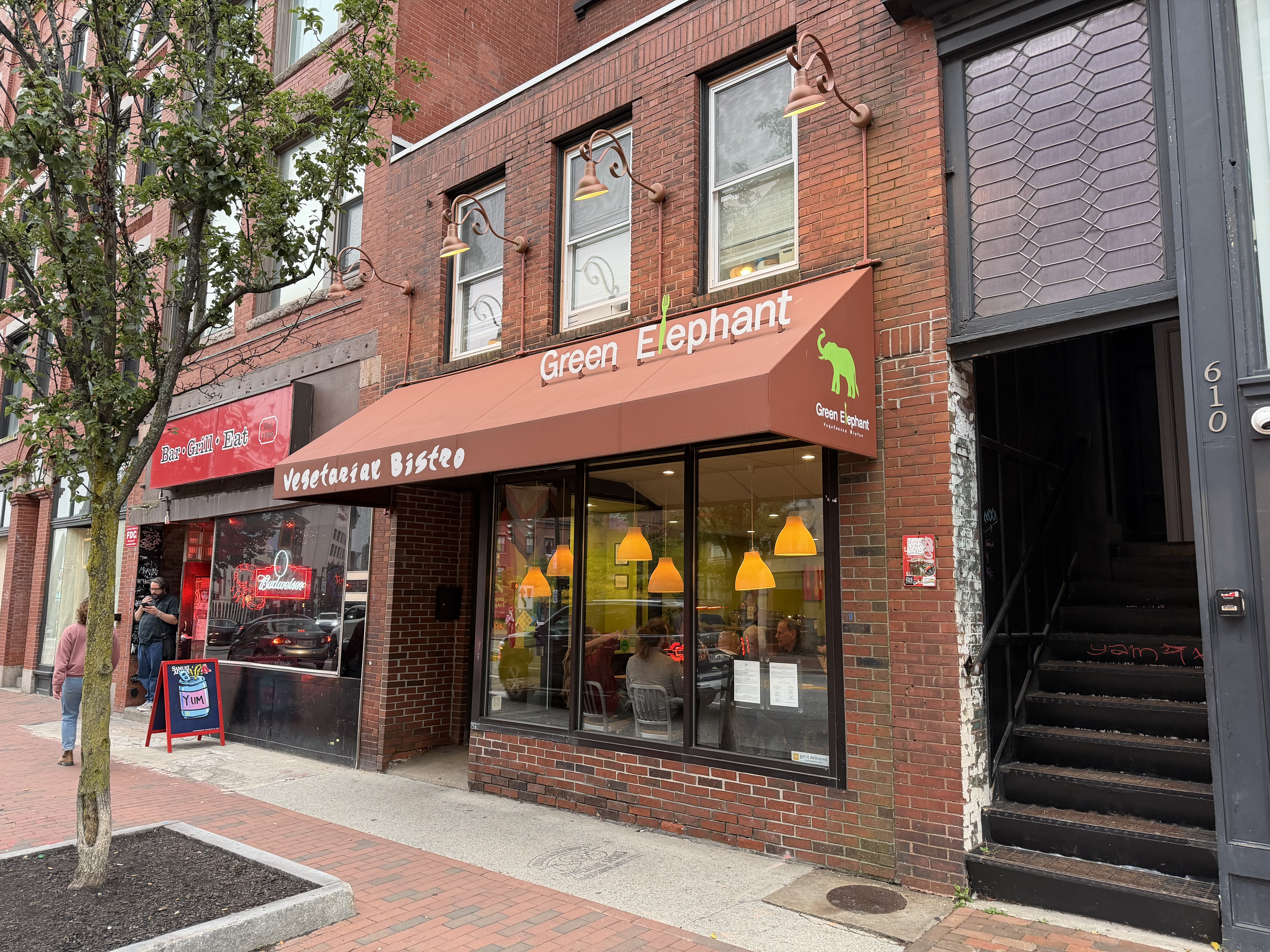
- 2025
- Interactive map of Green Elephant Vegetarian Bistro

Restaurant information
- Established: 2007
- Food type: vegetarian Thai cuisine
- Location: 608 Congress St, Portland, Maine, 04101
- Coordinates: 43°39′13.71″N 70°15′46.89″W
- Reservations: No
- Website: greenelephantmaine.com

The Green Elephant Vegetarian Bistro is a vegetarian restaurant serving Thai cuisine in Portland, Maine, which opened in 2007 in the city's Arts District. A second Green Elephant restaurant is located in Portsmouth, New Hampshire. Both have received critical attention for their vegetarian dishes.

== History ==
The restaurant was opened by chef Danai "Dan" Sriprasert and business partner Bob Wongsaichua at 608 Congress Street across from the State Theatre building. Sriprasert and Wongsaichua also own Boda, a Thai restaurant that serves some meat dishes. The restaurant is named as green represents vegetarian cooking and elephants are considered lucky.

A 2011 The Maine Magazine review by Joe Ricchio reported: "Sriprasert’s mother, who owned a restaurant in Thailand, taught him how to cook from a very early age ... His mother never used written recipes, and by cooking alongside her he began to develop his own personal style."

In 2015, a second Green Elephant opened at 35 Portwalk Place in Portsmouth, New Hampshire. During the 2020 COVID-19 pandemic, the Portland restaurant closed for a month and a half before reopening.

== Menu ==
The menu is appetizers, stir fries, curries, noodle dishes and desserts. All the food is vegetarian and most is vegan. The crispy duck, the char guay teow and the chocolate orange mousse pie have been mentioned by food reviewers.

== Reception ==
The restaurant does not take reservations. In 2012, The Boston Globe travel writer Hilary Nangle said the restaurant "has persuaded many carnivores that going veggie does not mean sacrificing flavor." In 2013, Travel + Leisure named the restaurant to its list of the "Best Vegetarian Restaurants in the U.S."

In 2016, the Maine Sunday Telegram's restaurant reviewer James H. Schwartz gave the restaurant three stars and wrote: "It’s fun, congenial and healthful, an easy place for vegetarians, dedicated carnivores – and the rest of us – to enjoy." In 2016, Guy Fieri ate at the Portsmouth location and called the food "one of the best vegetarian meals I've had in a long time." In 2016, the Green Elephant in Portsmouth was named Best Vegan Restaurant in the state by New Hampshire Magazine.

In 2019, The Daily Meal named the restaurant to its list of "The Most Vegan-Friendly Restaurant in Every State." In 2020, the Portland Press Herald's vegan food writer Avery Yale Kamila called the restaurant Maine's "reigning vegetarian restaurant queen."

In 2021, Yelp released a list naming the best vegetarian restaurant in each state and Green Elephant Vegetarian Bistro was listed as the best vegetarian restaurant in Maine. In 2023, a The Boston Globe travel review about traveling to Portland with children said the restaurant has "kid-friendly bites like crunchy edamame and veggie dumplings with two kinds of dip."
