= One Longfellow Square =

Coordinates: 43°39′11″N 70°15′59″W

One Longfellow Square is a non-profit performing arts and concert venue in Portland, Maine, United States. Located in Longfellow Square, the building is home to the Center for Cultural Exchange, which opened on March 5, 1999, in the renovated building. The building was abandoned in 1994 and purchased by Portland Performing Arts in 1998. After the group spent nearly $800,000 to renovate the space. The venue nearly permanently closed due to financial losses sustained due to safety restrictions put in place during the COVID-19 pandemic.
