= India Street Historic District =

Historic district in Maine, United States

Coordinates: 43.661°N 70.251°W

The India Street Historic District is a historic district in Portland, Maine, United States. It is named for the city's first street, India Street, in the downtown area, which has been inhabited since the 17th century.

== Background ==
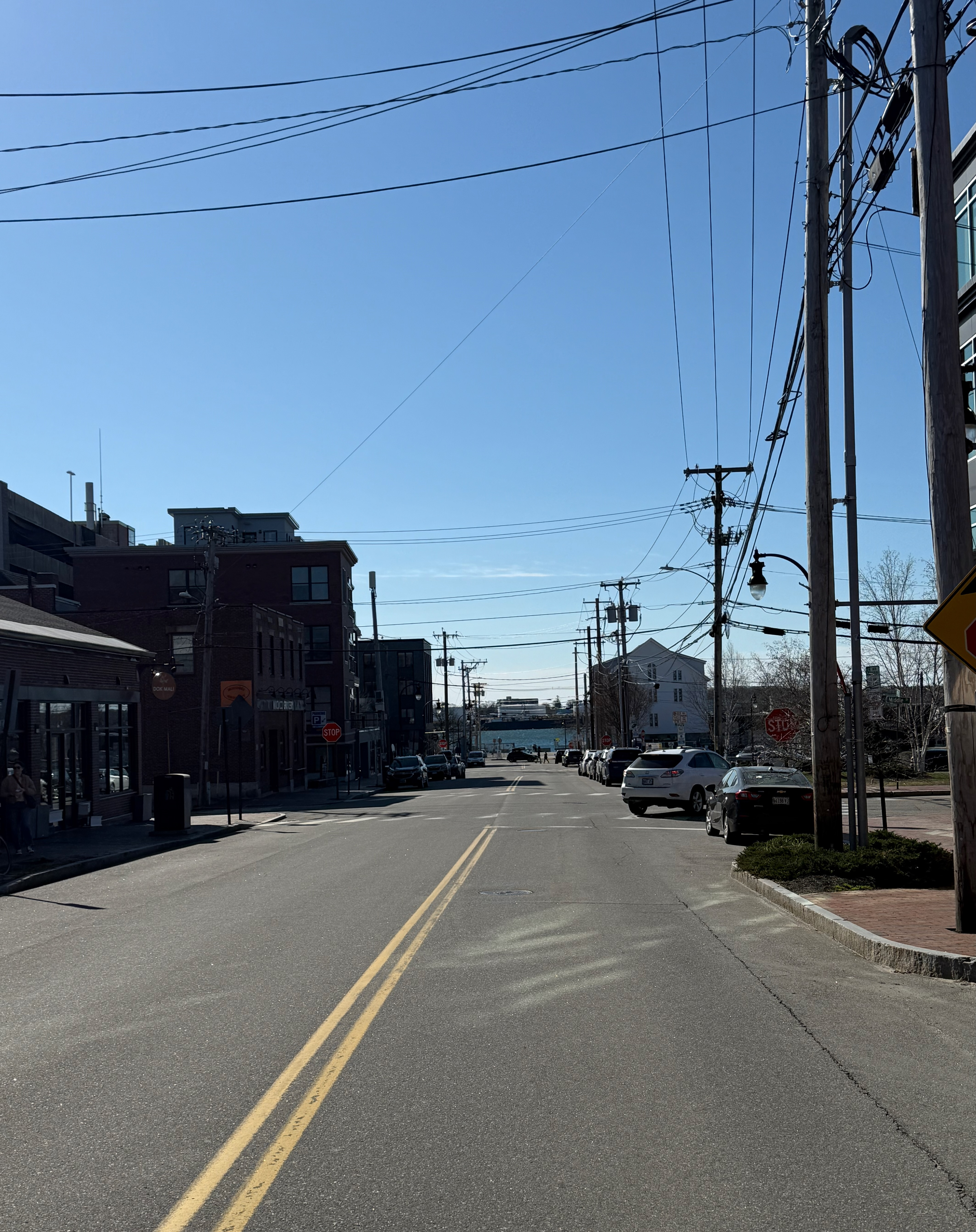
India Street, looking southeast toward Portland's working waterfront

The India Street Historic District was designated by Portland City Council in 2015 after a unanimous (8–0) vote. As a result, maximum building heights of 50 feet (15 m) were introduced on India Street, as well as parts of Commercial Street, Middle Street and Congress Street. The following year, the Historic Preservation and Planning Board recommended that the boundaries of the India Street Historic District be expanded to include 96 and 100 Federal Street as contributing buildings. The council passed the motion in June.

== See also ==
- National Register of Historic Places listings in Portland, Maine
