= Thomas J. Sparrow =

American architect

- Born: March 4, 1805; Portland, Maine, U.S.
- Died: December 22, 1870 (aged 65); Brownville, Maine, U.S.
- Occupation: Architect
- Buildings: Sparrow Block; Captain Reuben Merrill House; Mechanics' Hall

Thomas J. Sparrow (March 4, 1805 – December 22, 1870) was a prominent American architect active in the first half of the 19th century. Only three of his designs are known to be extant, with two of them now being listed on the National Register of Historic Places.

== Early life ==
Sparrow was born in Portland, Maine, on March 4, 1805.

== Career ==
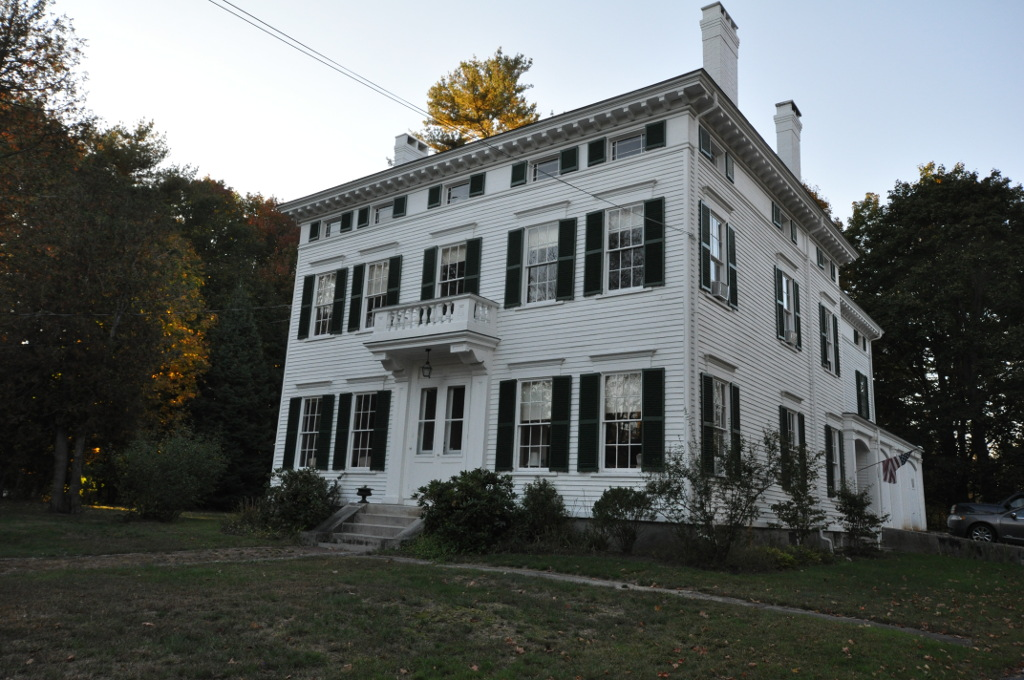
The Captain Reuben Merrill House in Yarmouth, Maine

Sparrow began in the organ-manufacturing business under John K. Paine. He then moved into carpentry and was listed as a joiner in the Portland Directory of 1837. Its next edition, four years later, showed him as being the city's first native professional architect.

He was active into the 1860s, when ill health prevented him from partaking in the rebuilding of Portland after the great fire of 1866.

=== Selected notable works ===
- Sparrow Block, Portland, Maine (1849)
- Captain Reuben Merrill House, Yarmouth, Maine (1858) – now listed on the National Register of Historic Places
- Mechanics' Hall, Portland, Maine (1859) – now listed on the National Register of Historic Places

== Death ==
Sparrow died on December 22, 1870, in Brownville, Maine, aged 65.

The Sparrow Lecture, held at Portland's Mechanics' Hall, is named in his honor.
