= Henry Wadsworth Longfellow Monument =

- U.S. National Register of Historic Places
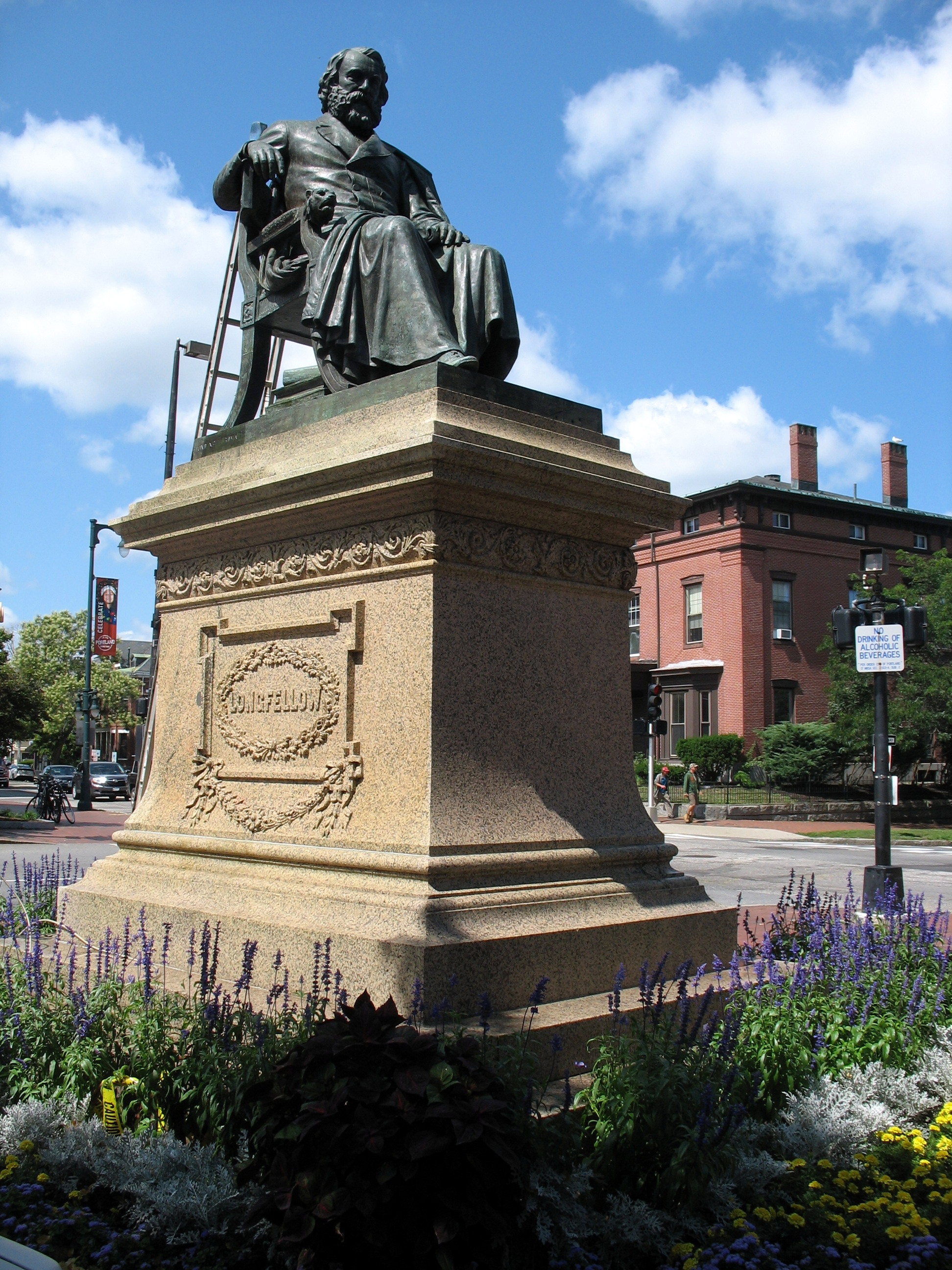

- Location within Maine Location within the United States
- Location: Corner of State Street and Congress Street, Portland, Maine
- Coordinates: 43°39′11″N 70°16′2″W
- Area: less than one acre
- Built: 1888
- Architect: Francis H. Fassett, Franklin Simmons
- NRHP reference No.: 90000580
- Added to NRHP: April 5, 1990

The Henry Wadsworth Longfellow Monument is a public monument in Portland, Maine's West End. Located on the corner of State and Congress Street, it honors poet Henry Wadsworth Longfellow, who was born in Portland in 1807. The intersection built around the monument is known as Longfellow Square.

== Description ==
The Henry Wadsworth Longellow Monument occupies a triangular plaza formed at the southeast corner of Congress and State Streets in central Portland. The southeast side of the plaza is occupied by One Longfellow Square. The monument consists of a bronze statue of Longfellow, as seen late in his life, in a seated position, which is mounted on a granite pedestal. The pedestal is about 10 feet (3.0 m) in height, and has carved tablets on two sides, decorated with swags and garlands that frame the name "LONGFELLOW". Above these is a frieze band of anthemion and vines, with a cornice above that. The bronze statue is about 7 feet (2.1 m) in height, with Longfellow seated in a chair whose arms end in lion's heads, and a stack of books underneath. Longfellow wears an overcoat, and a cape is draped over his lap and one shoulder. One hand holds a manuscript, while the other is propped on the chair back, while Longfellow gazes at passersby.

== History ==
Franklin Simmons began the design and construction of the statue in 1885, three years after the poet's death, with a pedestal designed by Francis H. Fassett. The monument was unveiled on September 29, 1888. The monument is considered to be one of Simmons's major commissions. It was added to the National Register of Historic Places in April 1990.

== Gallery ==
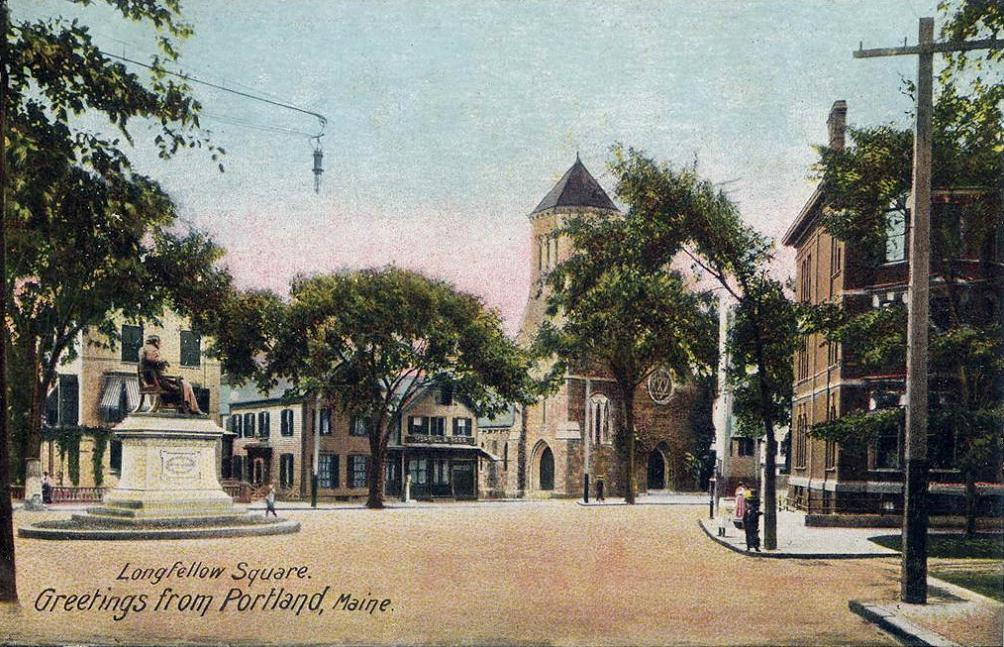
Longfellow Square on a postcard in 1906.

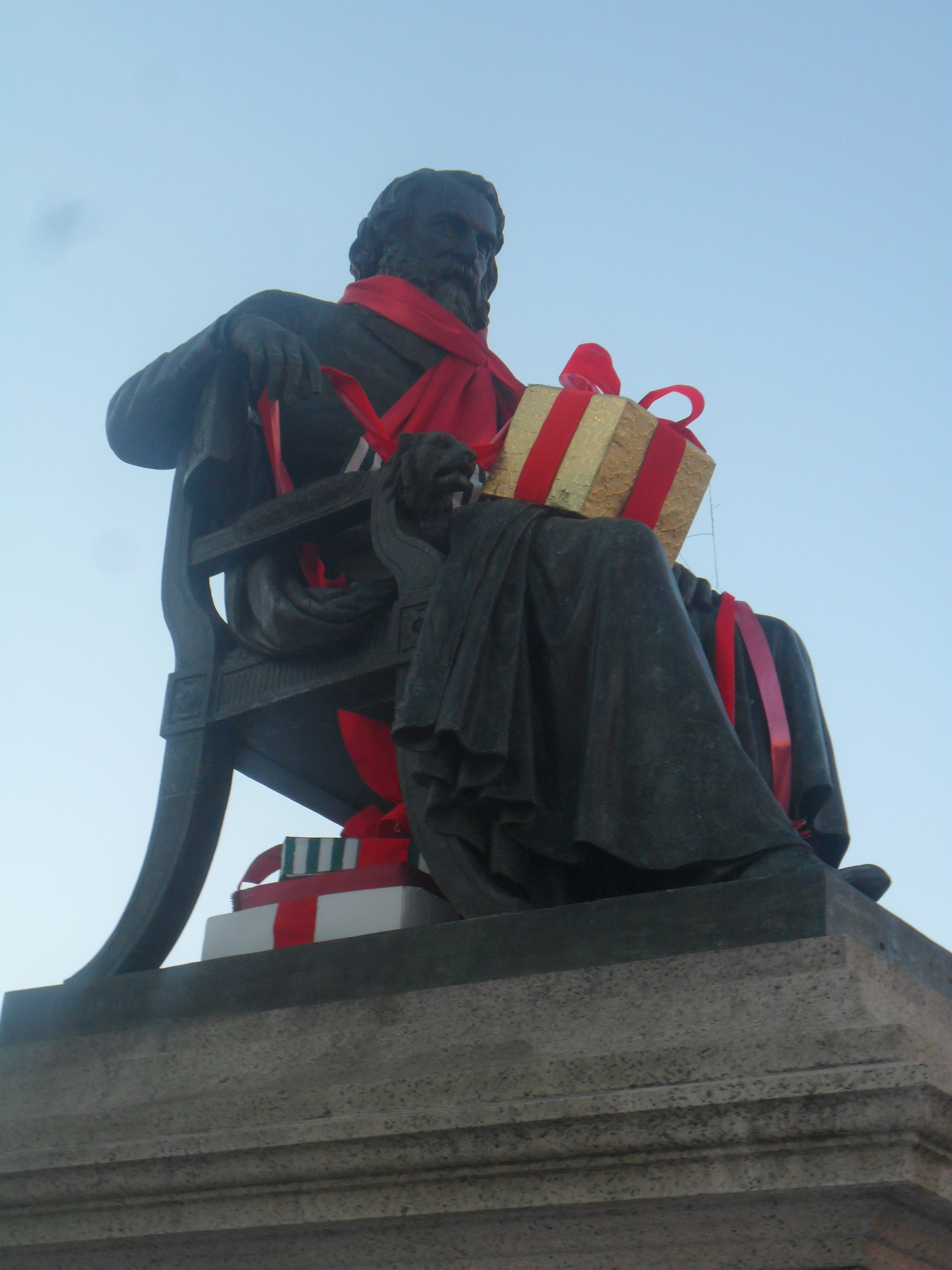
The Longfellow Monument in December 2010.

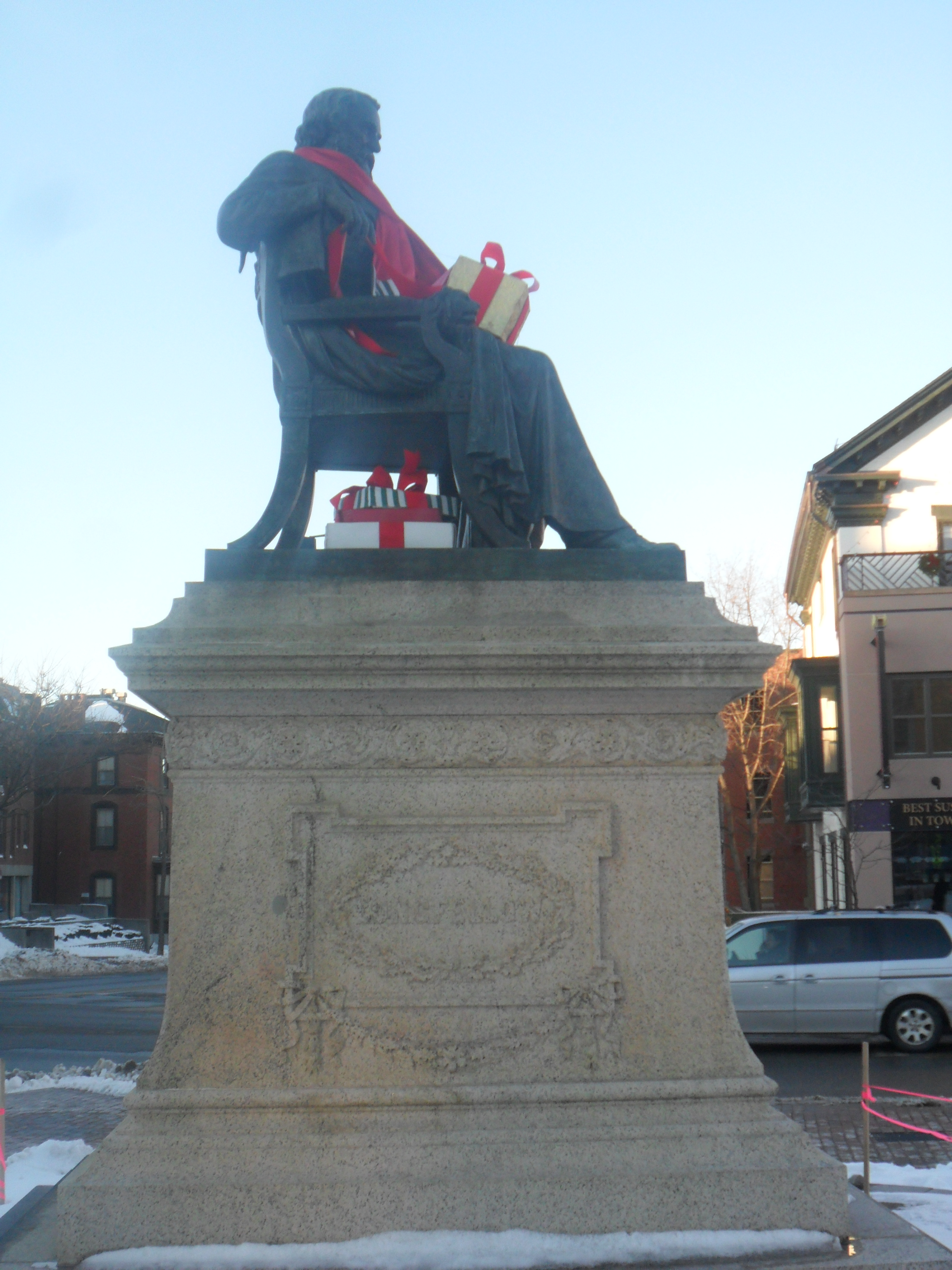
The Longfellow Monument in December 2010.

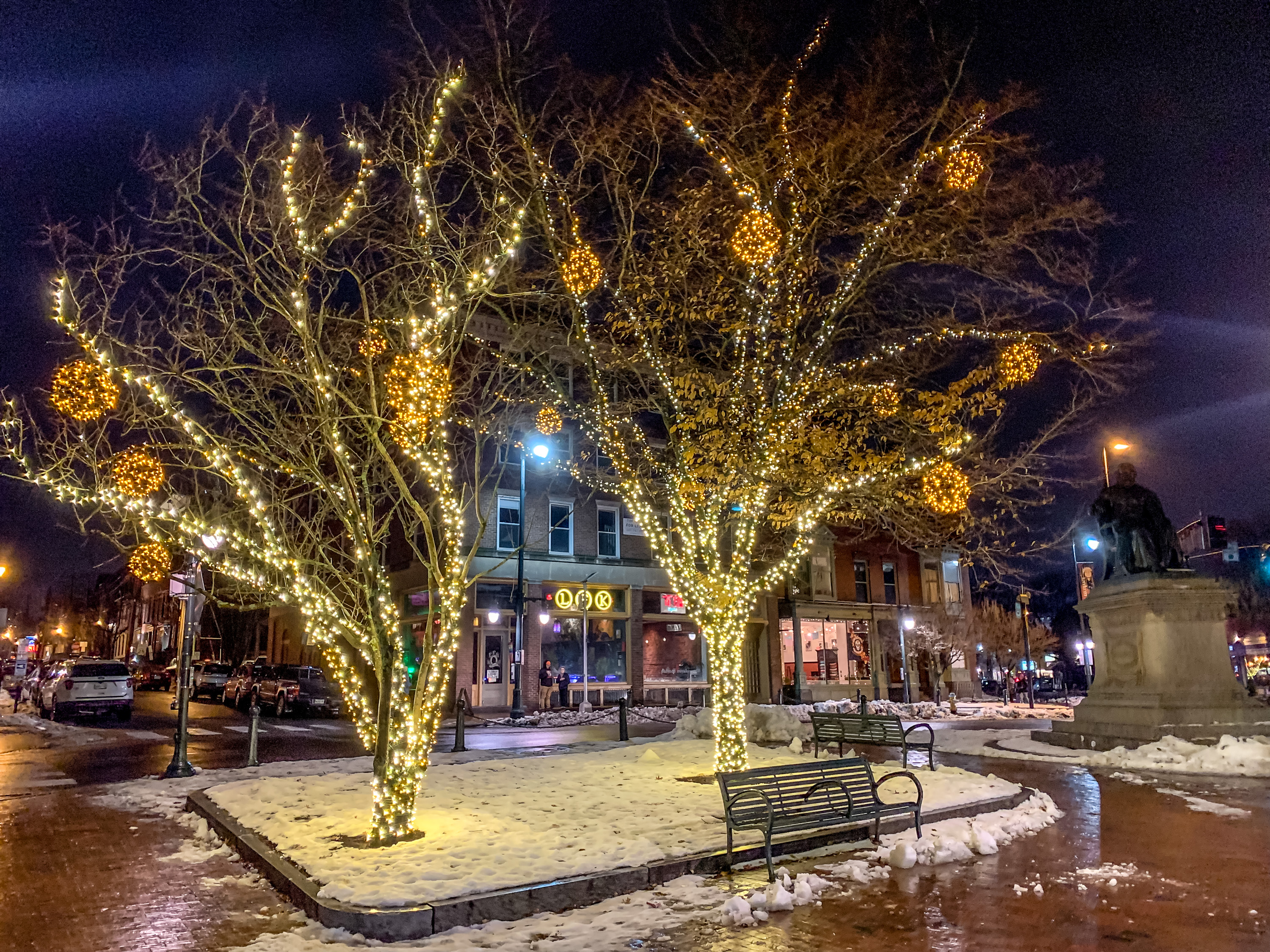
Longfellow Square illuminated for the 2018 holiday season. Longfellow Monument is at right.

== See also ==
- National Register of Historic Places listings in Portland, Maine
- Henry Wadsworth Longfellow Memorial in Washington, D. C.
