= Congress Square Park =

Park in Portland, Maine

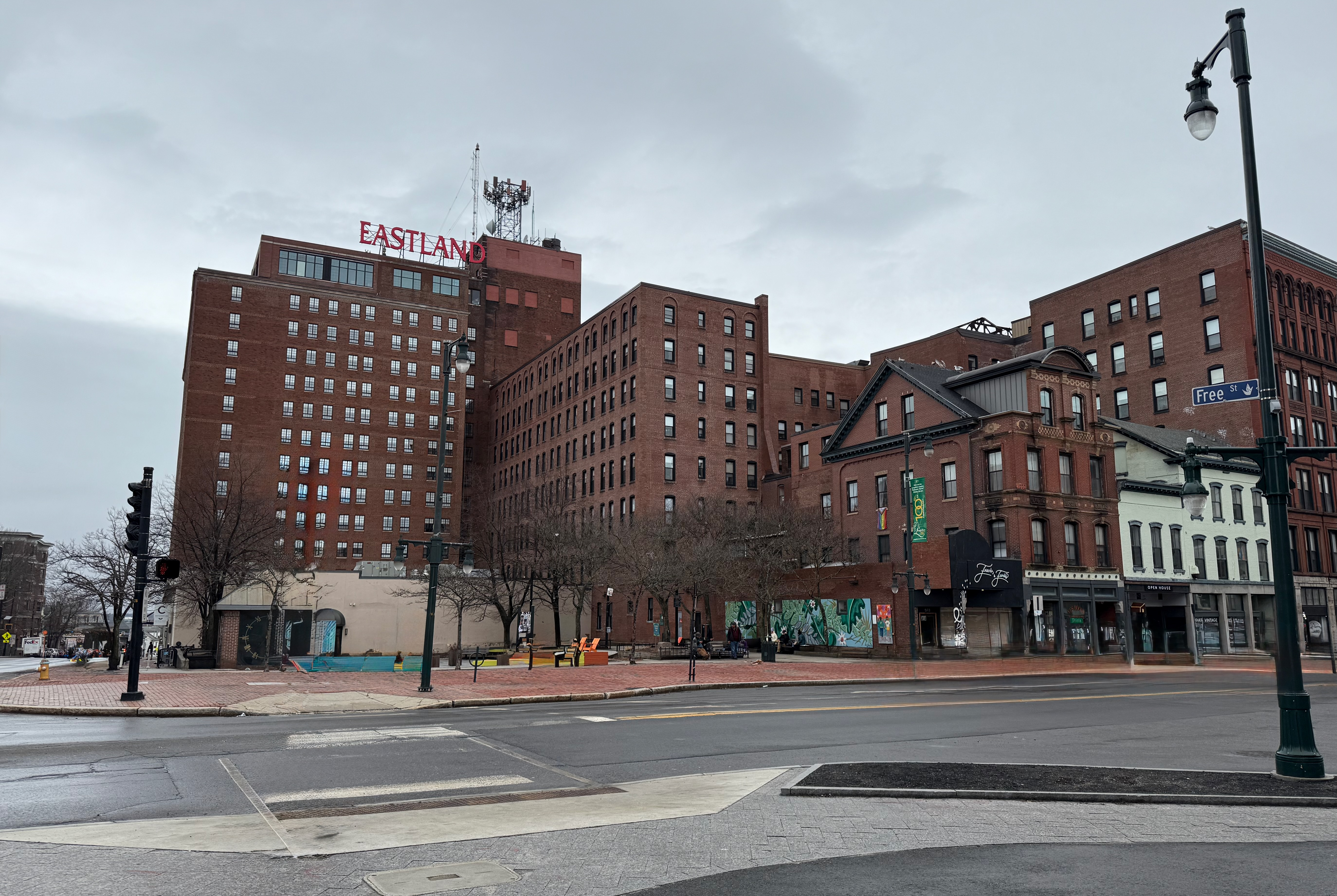
- Pictured in 2025
- Interactive map of Congress Square Park
- Type: Park
- Location: Portland, Maine, United States
- Coordinates: 43°39′16″N 70°15′48″W
- Operator: City of Portland, Maine
- Open: 1982
- Designation: Park

Congress Square Park is a small public park in the Arts District of Portland, Maine. The park includes a stage for performances and areas for sitting. It is also home to a large, historic clock which had previously been located at Union Station.

== History ==
The park was built in 1982 with an urban development grant from the United States Department of Housing and Urban Development. Starting in 2012, the city, led by Mayor Michael F. Brennan and City Manager Jon Jennings, sought to sell the park to a private equity firm Rockbridge Capital, which was renovating the adjacent hotel. Rockbridge sought to build a single story event center over most of the park. However, residents (led by the Friends of Congress Square Park) drafted an ordinance which sought to prevent the sale until a vote could occur. After collecting a sufficient number of signatures, the sale was postponed until after a June 2014 referendum. In that election, voters endorsed their initiative, which prevented the sale of the public and added protections to the further sale of public spaces.

Since 2013, the Friends of Congress Square Park has organized events, raised funds on behalf of, and maintained the park. In 2018, the city received a $33,000 grant for a public art project in the park.
