= Portland City Hall =

Portland City Hall may refer to:

- Portland City Hall (Maine)
- Portland City Hall (Oregon)
