= David Turin =

American restaurateur

- Culinary career
- Current restaurants
- David's (since 1992); David's 388 (since 2005); David's Opus Ten (since 2012)

David Turin is an American restaurateur. He was named 2012 Chef of the Year by the Maine Restaurant Association. Having opened twelve restaurants during his career, he now runs three in Maine: David's, David's Opus Ten and David's 388.

== Early life ==
Turin's father died when Turin was in high school. He graduated from Milton Academy in Massachusetts. Shortly thereafter, after being rejected from Cornell University, he moved to Mattapan, where he began his first role in a restaurant kitchen. He later applied to Cornell again, and was successful.

== Career ==
Turin began working in the food industry in the 1980s. He moved to Maine in 1992 and opened David's in Monument Square, Portland. He followed this with David's 388, at 388 Cottage Road in South Portland. His most recent venture is David's Opus Ten, a restaurant-within-a-restaurant at the Monument Square location. In 2014, he opened David's KPT in Kennebunkport, Maine, but it closed after five seasons.

== Personal life ==
As of 2020, Turin was married to Christy Bomba and they lived in Scarborough, Maine. They had six children.
