= One Monument Square =

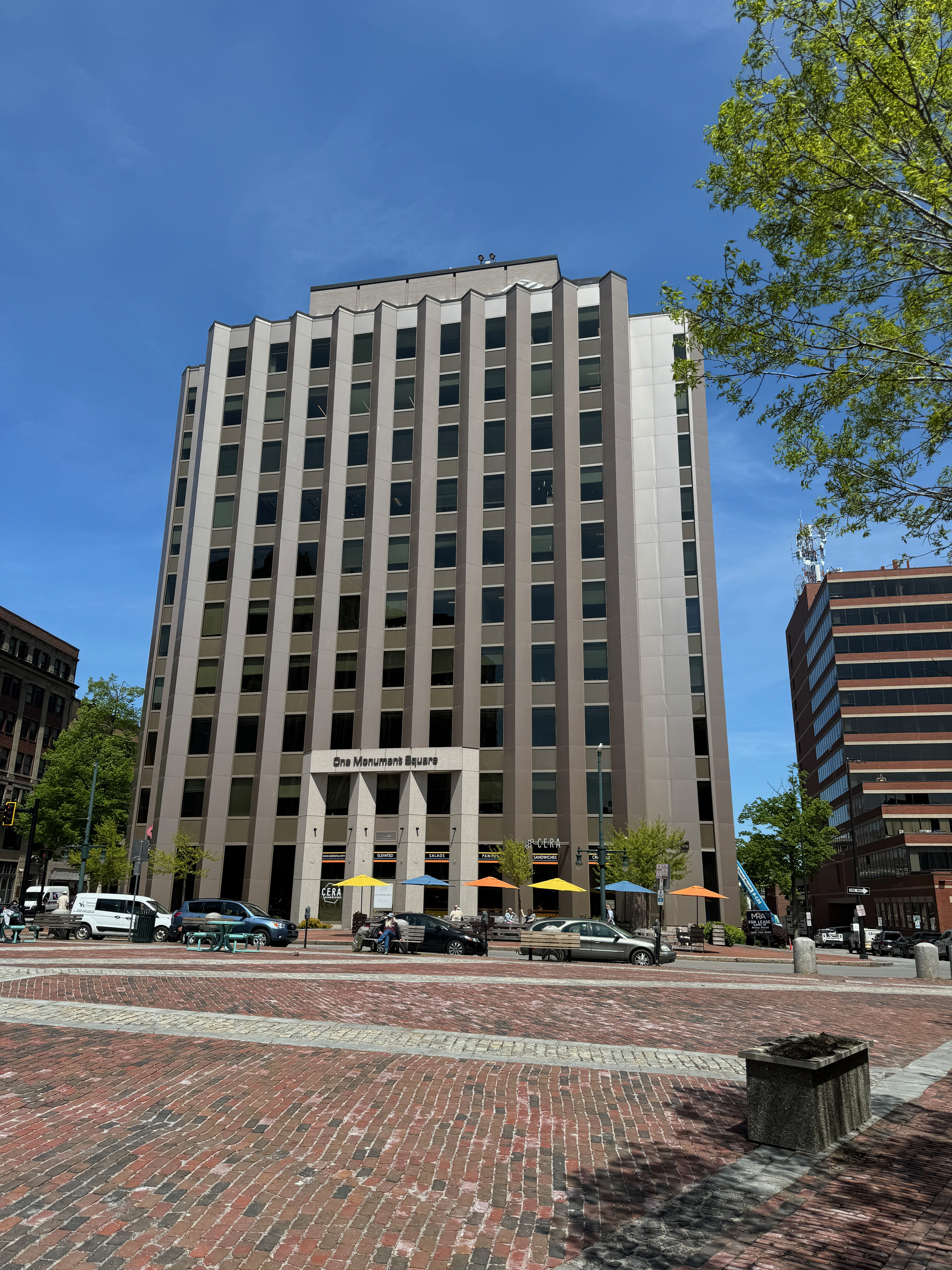
- The building in 2024

- Location within Maine

General information
- Type: High-rise building
- Location: Portland, Maine, U.S., 1 Monument Square
- Coordinates: 43.6575°N 70.2586°W
- Completed: 1969 (57 years ago)
- Landlord: Finard

Technical details
- Floor count: 10
- Floor area: 124,671 sq ft

One Monument Square is a ten-storey office building located in Monument Square, Portland, Maine. It stands at the former location of the United States Hotel, which was one of the oldest hotels in the city, having been in business for 97 years. It was demolished in 1965, and replaced four years by the current structure, with a plaque in front denoting the site as the former location of the hotel.

== Then and now ==
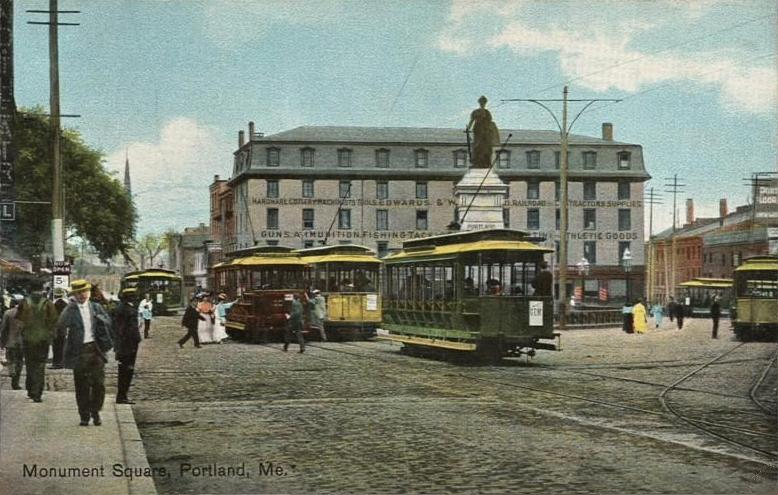
A 1909 view of Monument Square, with the former United States Hotel behind the Soldiers' and Sailors' Monument, itself behind a Portland Railroad Company trolleycar

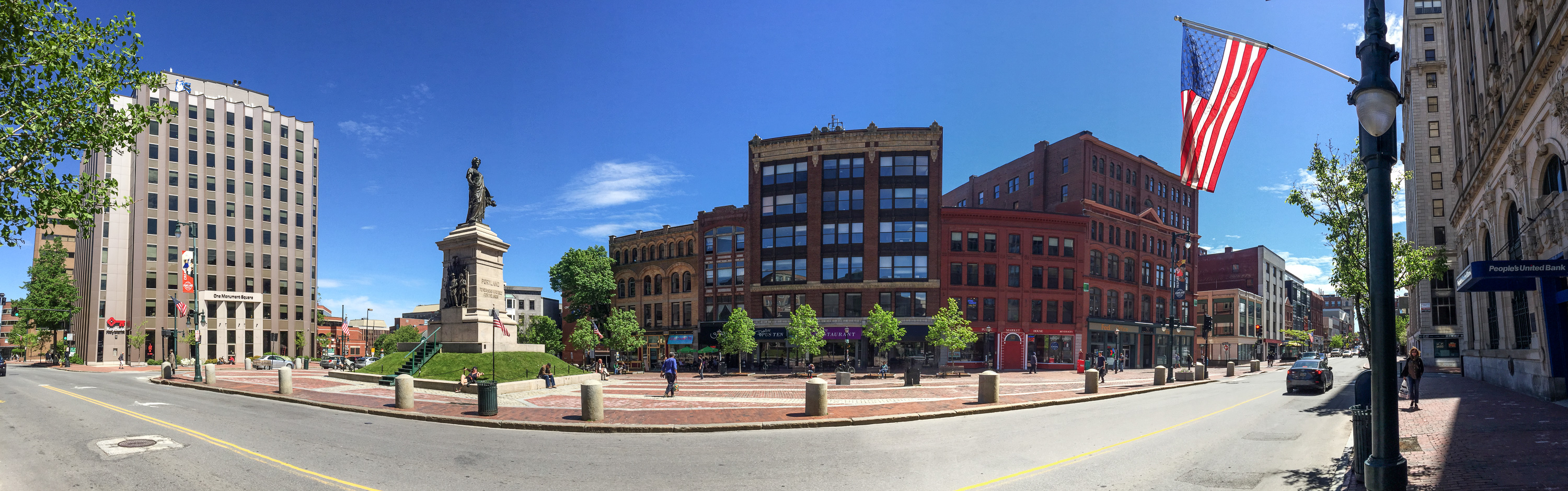
A similar view in 2017
