= United States Hotel =

United States Hotel could refer to:

- United States Hotel (Los Angeles), a demolished hotel in Los Angeles, California
- United States Hotel (Portland, Maine), a demolished hotel in Portland, Maine
- the United States Hotel Stakes, a defunct thoroughbred horse race
