= Portland City Hall (Maine) =

- U.S. National Register of Historic Places

- Location within Maine Location within the United States
- Location: 389 Congress Street, Portland, Maine
- Coordinates: 43.65930°N 70.25730°W
- Area: 1.125 acres (0.455 ha)
- Built: 1909 (117 years ago)
- Architect: Carrère & Hastings; John Calvin Stevens
- NRHP reference No.: 73000119
- Added to NRHP: May 7, 1973

Portland City Hall is the center of city government in Portland, Maine. The fourth city hall built in Portland, it is located at 389 Congress Street, on a prominent rise, anchoring a cluster of civic buildings at the eastern end of Portland's downtown. The structure was built between 1909 and 1912 and was listed on the National Register of Historic Places in 1973.

== Architecture ==
Portland City Hall occupies much of the city block bounded by Congress Street, Myrtle Street, Chestnut Street, and Cumberland Avenue, and stands at the head of Exchange Street. Its original main portion is a U-shaped granite structure, the U open to Congress Street. A modern ell extends along Myrtle Street, behind the right leg of the U. The central portion is three stories in height, with roof dormers fronted by a low balustrade. A tower, 200 feet (61 m) in height, rises from the center of this section. Ground floor windows are set in rounded openings, a feature continued around the wings. There are three entrances, accessed via a broad set of stairs; the central one is topped by the city seal. The wings are two stories in height, with projecting colonnades of Tuscan columns facing the inside of the U. The wings are covered by hip roofs, with a bracketed cornice extending around.

The interior of the building houses the city's offices. The addition on Myrtle Street also includes Merrill Auditorium, a 1,908-seat performance venue. The organ it houses, the Kotzschmar Memorial Organ, was the second-largest in the world at the time of its construction in 1912.

Portland City Hall is the third city hall building in its Congress Street location. It was designed by New York City firm Carrère & Hastings, with local assistance provided by John Calvin Stevens and John Howard Stevens. Inspired by New York City Hall, John M. Carrère considered it one of his finest works. It was built between 1909 and 1912 to replace the previous city hall, designed by Francis H. Fassett and built in 1867 but which burned in 1908. The city hall built in 1867 replaced the previous city hall, built in 1862 (designed by James H. Rand) and burned in the Great Fire of 1866. Portland's 1825 Market House, in what was then Market Square, was remodeled in 1833 to serve as Portland's first city hall. It was used again between 1866 and 1868, after the fire. It was demolished in 1888.

Brass plaques, mounted on the pillars at the base of the steps to the building, commemorate soldiers who fought in the Spanish-American War through Vietnam.

== Iterations ==
There have been four versions of Portland's city hall between 1833 and the present day:

- 1833 city hall, Market Square (a modified version of the 1825 Market House; demolished in 1888)
- 1862 city hall, Congress Street (destroyed by fire in 1866)
- 1868 city hall, Congress Street (destroyed by fire in 1908)
- 1909 city hall, Congress Street (today's structure)

== Gallery ==
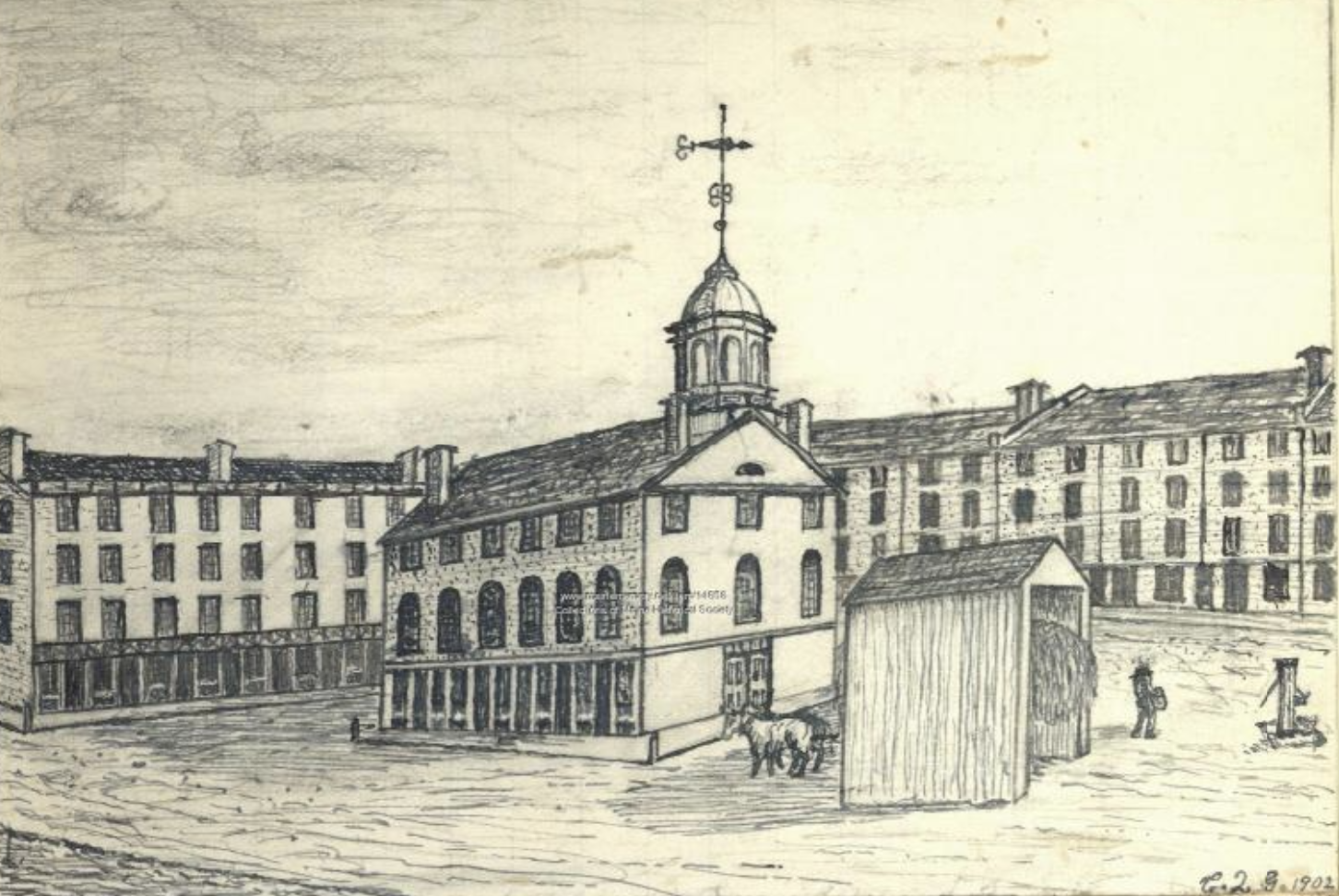
A 1902 sketch by Charles Quincy Goodhue of Market House (c. 1830), which was modified in 1833 to become the first city hall

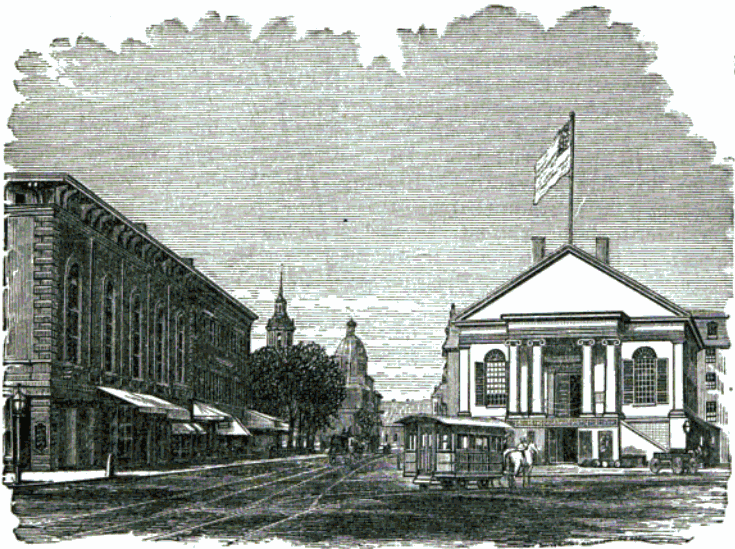
The 1868 city hall can be seen to the left of the original 1833 city hall in this 1874 illustration

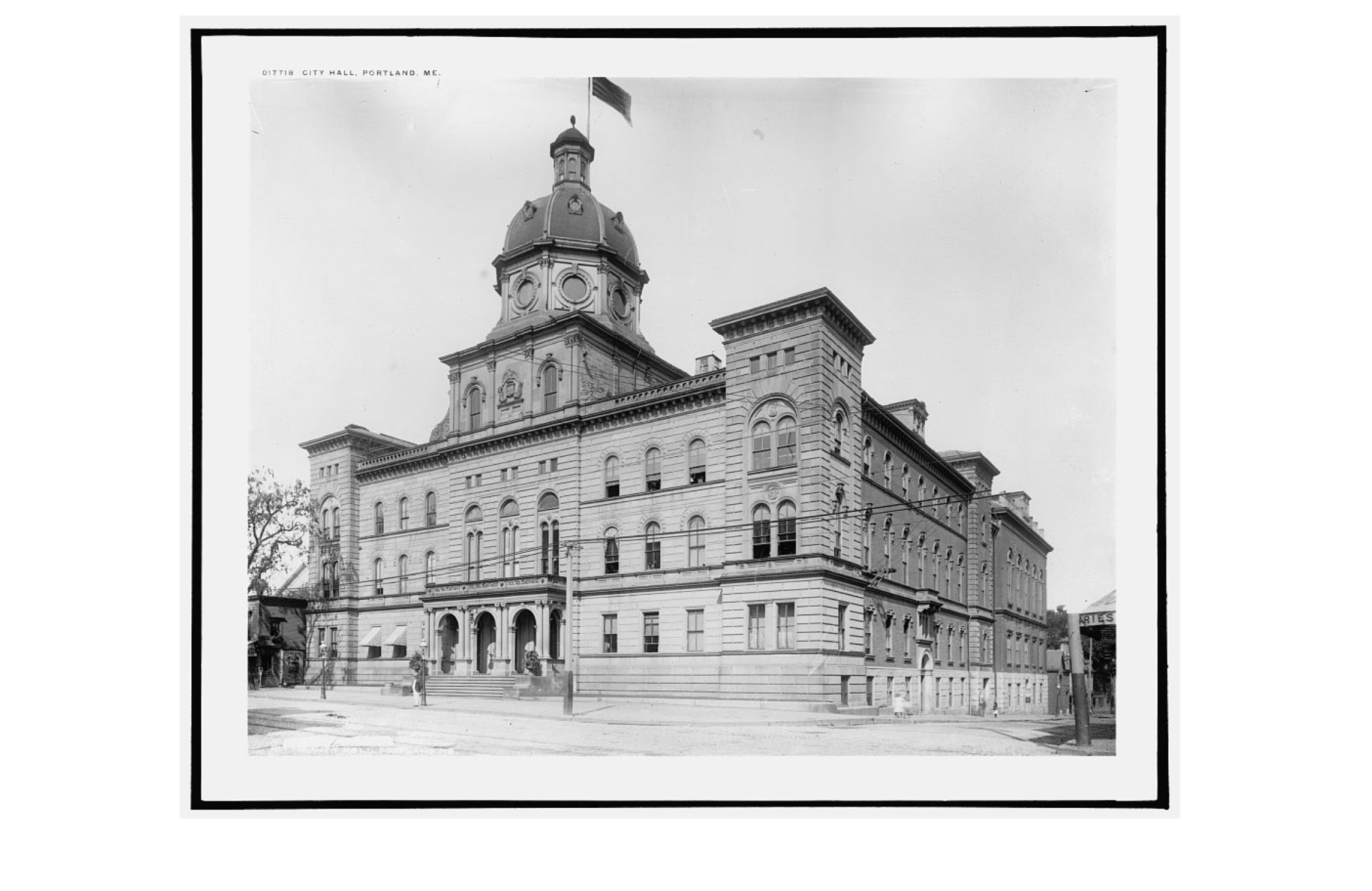
The 1868 city hall, pictured around 1904

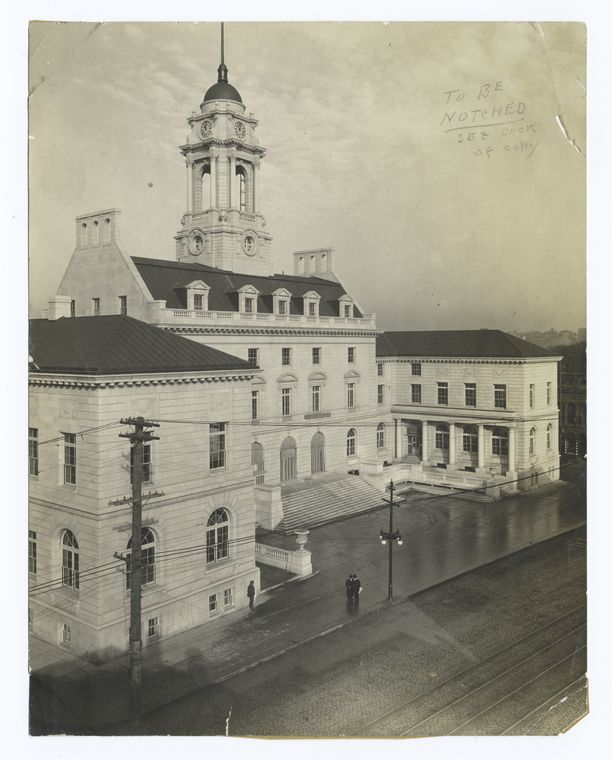
View of the Portland City Hall circa 1910

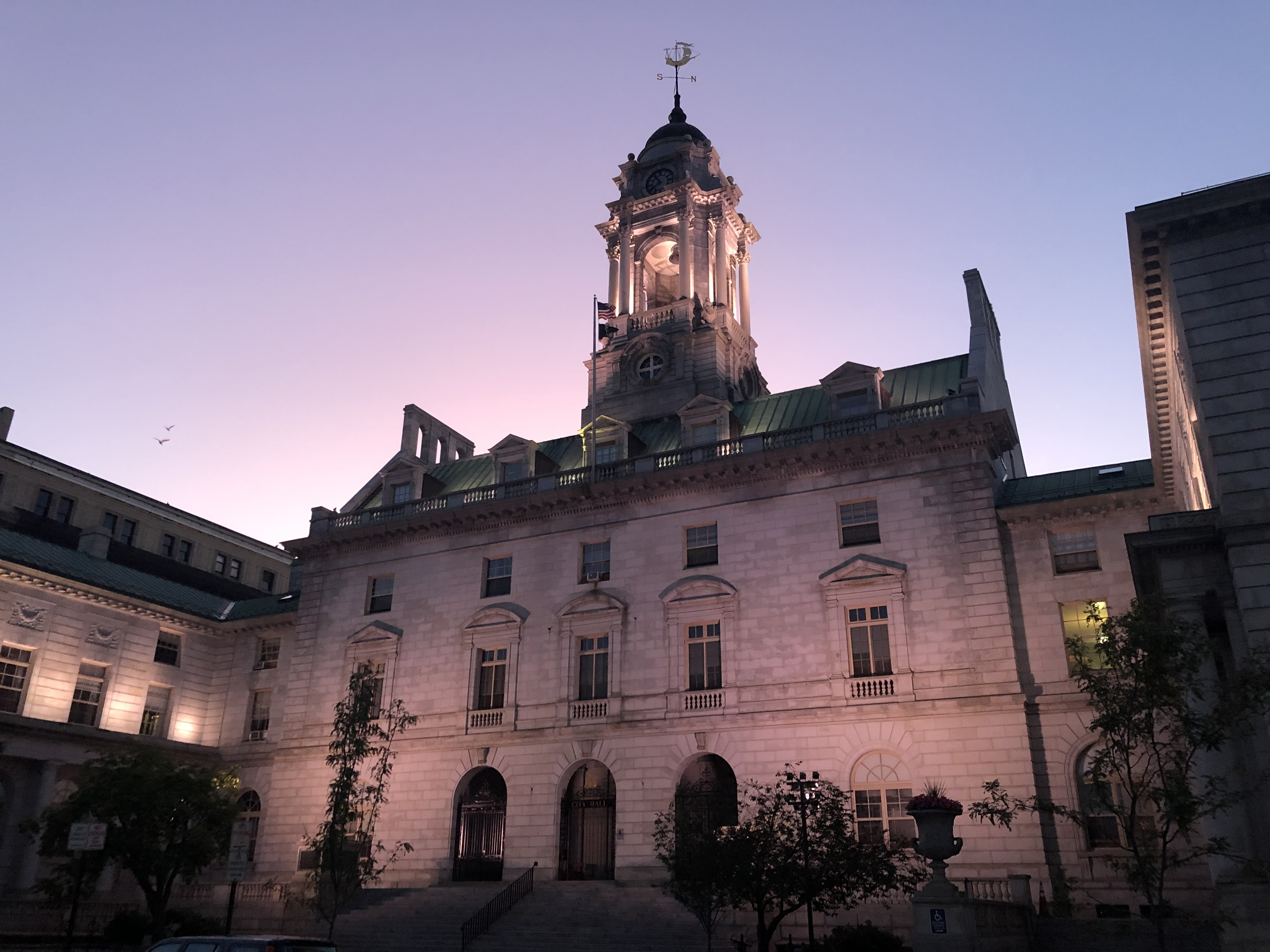
2019

== See also ==
- National Register of Historic Places listings in Portland, Maine
