= Soldiers' and Sailors' Monument (Portland, Maine) =

Statue in Portland, Maine

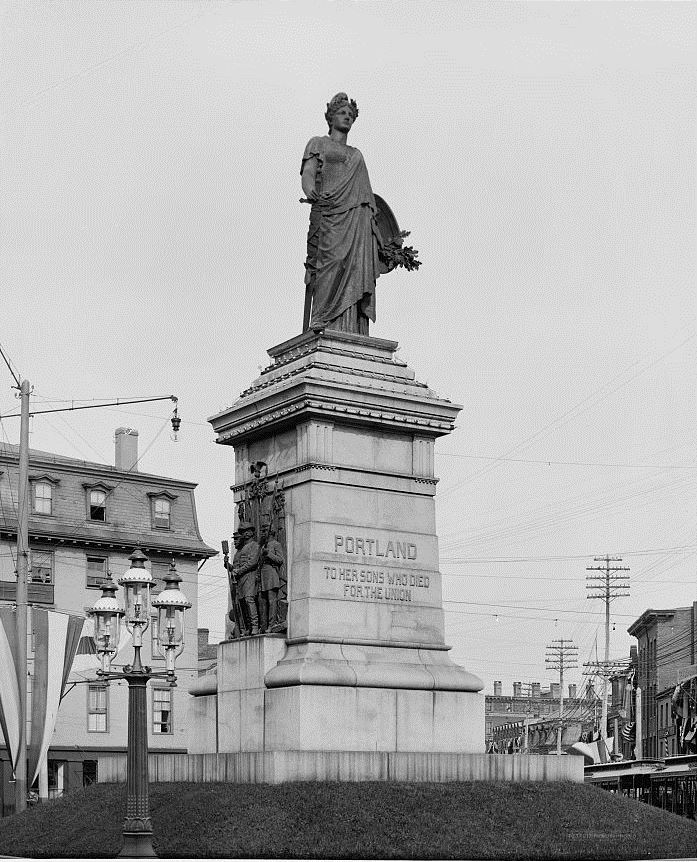
- The statue in the 1890s
- Interactive map of Soldiers' and Sailors' Monument
- Location: Monument Square, Portland, Maine, United States
- Coordinates: 43.65737°N 70.25892°W
- Designer: Franklin Simmons (statue); Richard Morris Hunt (base)
- Type: Statue
- Material: Bronze; Granite (base)
- Completion date: 1891 (135 years ago)
- Dedicated date: August 31, 1910
- Dedicated to: United States Army and United States Navy who died in the American Civil War
- Portland Soldiers and Sailors Monument
- U.S. National Register of Historic Places
- NRHP reference No.: 98000308
- Added to NRHP: April 1, 1998

The Soldiers' and Sailors' Monument (also known as "Our Lady of Victories") is a monumental statue located in Monument Square, Portland, Maine, United States. Dedicated on October 28, 1891, it honors "those brave men of Portland, soldiers of the United States army and sailors of the navy of the United States who died in defense of the country in the late civil war". The monument's base has the inscription Portland: To Her Sons Who Died for The Union.

It is a bronze statue mounted on a granite base, depicting a female figure facing west, clad in armor and covered by flowing robes. She is holding a sword wrapped in a belt in her right hand and a shield and a branch of oak leaves in her left hand. The figure is an allegorical representation of Victory. On two sides of the base stand bronze groups of three sailors and three soldiers. On the northern side, the central figure is Brigadier Francis L. Vinton of Fort Preble. Maine sailors are honored on the opposite side, with Admiral David G. Farragut being the central figure.

The sculpture was created by Maine sculptor Franklin Simmons; the base was designed by New York City architect Richard Morris Hunt. Portland architect Francis H. Fassett selected the site's original landscaping. The local Grand Army of the Republic lodge raised sufficient funds for to pay for the monument. It was added to the National Register of Historic Places on April 1, 1998.

The monument stands on the former location of Portland's Market House, which was built in 1825. It was modified in 1833 to become Portland's first city hall. The building was replaced by a new city hall in 1862 on Congress Street at the head of Exchange Street, leading to a years-long debate about what to do with the old city hall. The Portland Soldiers' and Sailors' Association formed in October 1873 and proposed replacing the building with a monument to Civil War veterans, drawing support from critic John Neal.

Once the association had raised more than $16,000 (equivalent to $573,333 in 2025) in early 1887, the City of Portland approved replacement. In February of that year the Association solicited design proposals from sculptors and architects nationwide. They received proposals from Clarence Luce, Henry Avery, John Calvin Stevens, Alexander C. Currier, all of which were rejected, along with James Phinney Baxter's idea to convert the Old City Hall into a memorial. In the spring of 1888, the Association sought a design from Franklin Simmons, who recruited Richard Morris Hunt to design the base.

The Old City Hall was demolished in 1888. The monument's cornerstone was laid on Memorial Day 1889; the completed monument was dedicated on October 28, 1891, at which time Market Square was renamed Monument Square. Association Chairman John Marshall Brown proclaimed, "at last, a fitting monument on the fittest spot, of the fairest city of our land." Total cost for the monument was $36,000 (equivalent to $1,290,000 in 2025).

== Sources ==
- City of Portland (1940). Portland City Guide. Portland, Maine: The Forest City Printing Company.
- Shettleworth, Earle G. Jr. (2005). "Creating and Preserving Portland's Urban Landscape, 1885–1925". Creating Portland: History and Place in Northern New England. Durham, New Hampshire: University of New Hampshire Press. pp. 247–273. ISBN 978-1-58465-521-3.
