= Fidelity Trust Building (Portland, Maine) =

Office building in Portland, Maine, United States

Coordinates: 43.657398°N 70.259402°W

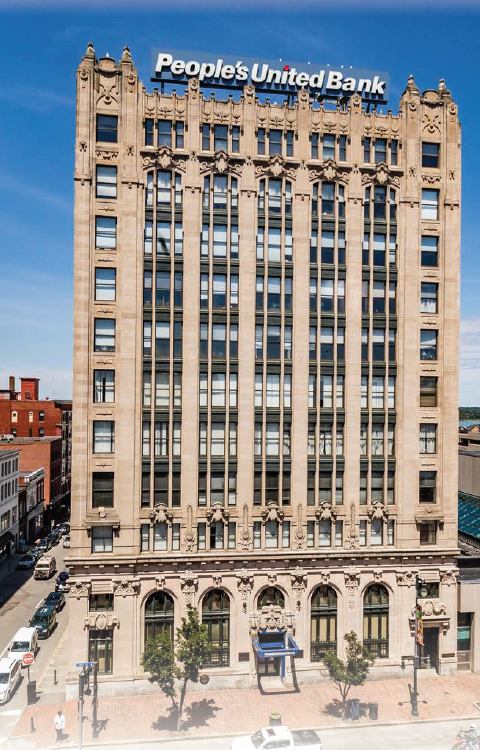
The building in 2019

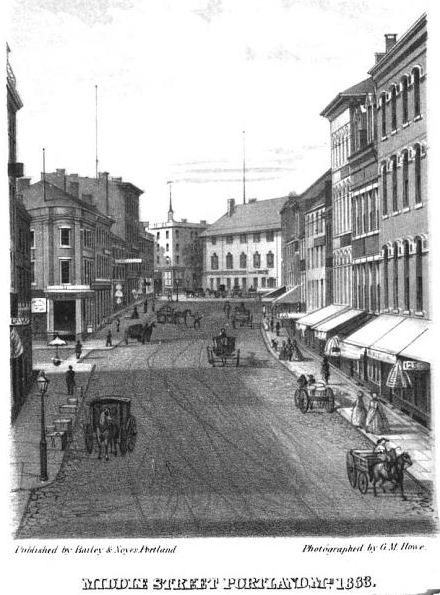
The predecessors to both the Fidelity Trust Building and, across Preble Street, the Time and Temperature Building are in view in this 1863 view of Middle Street

The Fidelity Trust building (previously, Maine Bank and Trust Building and the People's United Bank Building; currently the M&T Bank Building) is a historic office building in Monument Square, Portland, Maine.

Designed in the Beaux-Arts style by Boston architect George Henri Desmond, the 135-foot, 10-story building was Maine's first skyscraper. It is also notable for the ornate facade that covers the side and the top of the structure. It opened in 1910 to great fanfare, altering Portland's skyline. The building replaced The Portland Theatre (also known as Ward's Opera House, the Nickel Theatre, the Adelphia Theatre and the Family Theatre).

The building contains three elevators made by the Portland Company on Munjoy Hill. Two were electric, while the freight elevator was hydraulic.

As of 2019, the Fidelity Building was Maine's 11th-tallest building and the state's fourth-largest office building. It sits across Preble Street from the Time and Temperature Building. The building commands easterly views of downtown Portland and Casco Bay. Its westerly views show Back Cove and out to the White Mountains and Mount Washington in New Hampshire.

Today, it is often called the People's United Bank Building after its main tenant and large sign at the top. Other tenants include New England Cablevision, Dirigo Financial Group, and Nexrep. It is listed as an historic Portland Landmark.
