= Old City Hall (Portland, Maine) =

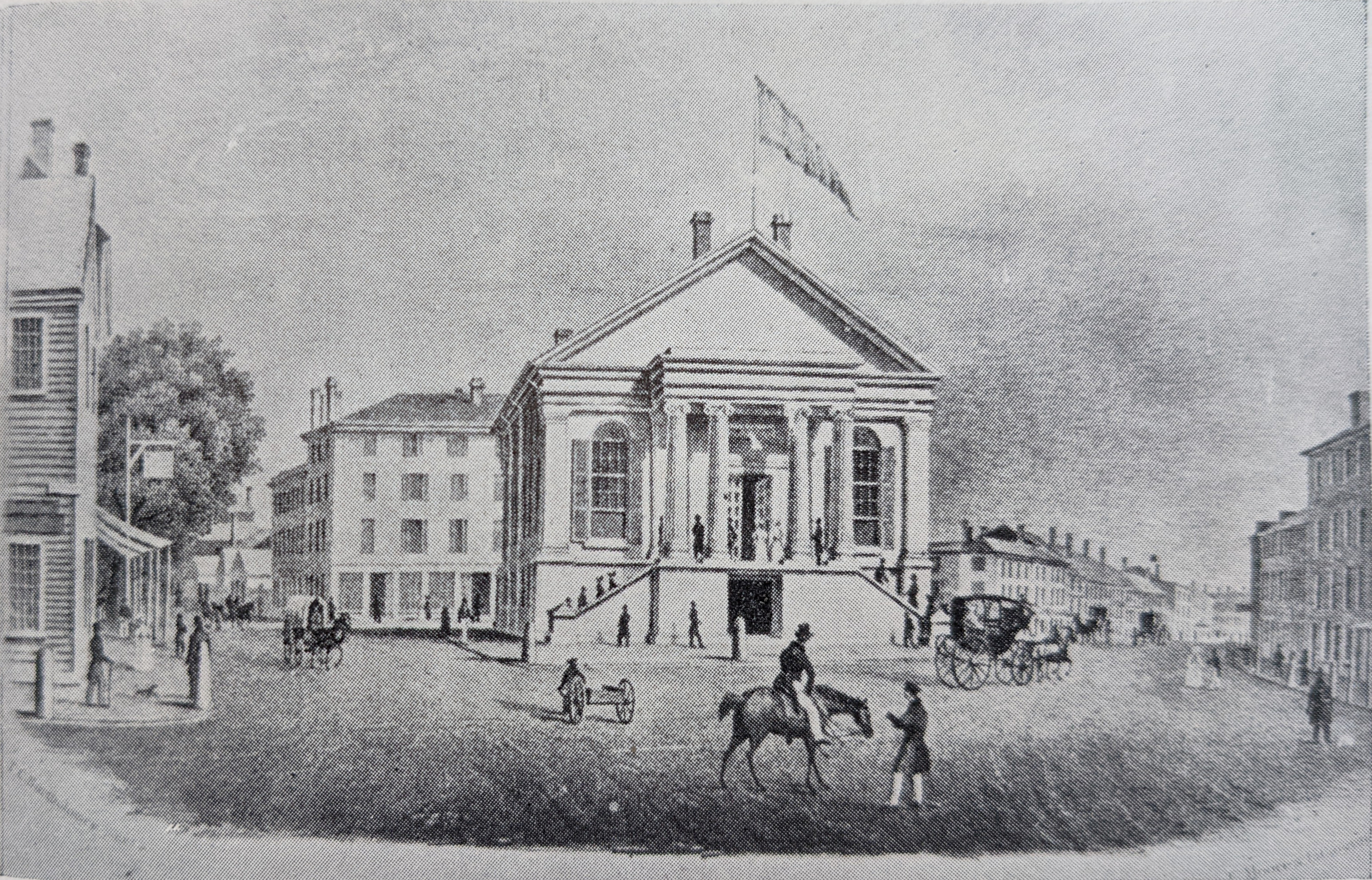
- A c. 1833 view, with today's Congress Street on the left and Middle Street on the right

- Shown in Maine
- 43.65738°N 70.25891°W
- Location: Portland, Maine

History
- Built: 1833
- Demolished: 1888 (138 years ago)

The Old City Hall of Portland, Maine, was located in what was then known as Market Square or Haymarket Square (Monument Square today) between 1833 and 1888, when it was demolished. In 1862, it was replaced by an earlier version of today's City Hall located on Congress Street, a short distance northeast of the original location.

== History ==
The Town of Portland built its Market House in Market (or Haymarket) Square 1825. The first floor in the building's early years housed stalls used by farmers to sell agricultural products. Also known as Military Hall, the building's simple gable appearance was modified in 1833, to plans made the previous year by Charles Quincy Clapp. Clapp updated the building to the Greek Revival style by removing the cupola from the roof and adding a portico to the front. The cupola was reinstalled on the Universalist school house (now Alumni Hall on the University of New England campus) in Portland's Deering neighborhood.

The new building was the site of the 1855 Portland Rum Riot, which involved mayor Neal Dow and led to one death. It was replaced by a new city hall in 1862 on Congress Street at the head of Exchange Street, leading to a years-long debate about what to do with the old city hall. The Portland Soldiers' and Sailors' Association formed in October 1873 and proposed replacing the building with a monument to American Civil War veterans, drawing support from critic John Neal. Approval from the City of Portland came in early 1887, and the building was demolished in 1888. The Soldiers' and Sailors' Monument was dedicated on October 28, 1891, at which time Market Square was renamed Monument Square.

Between 1866 and 1868, the old city hall building was brought into use as such again, after the first iteration of the Congress Street building burned in the fire of 1866.

The United States Hotel, built in 1803, stood behind both iterations of the building.

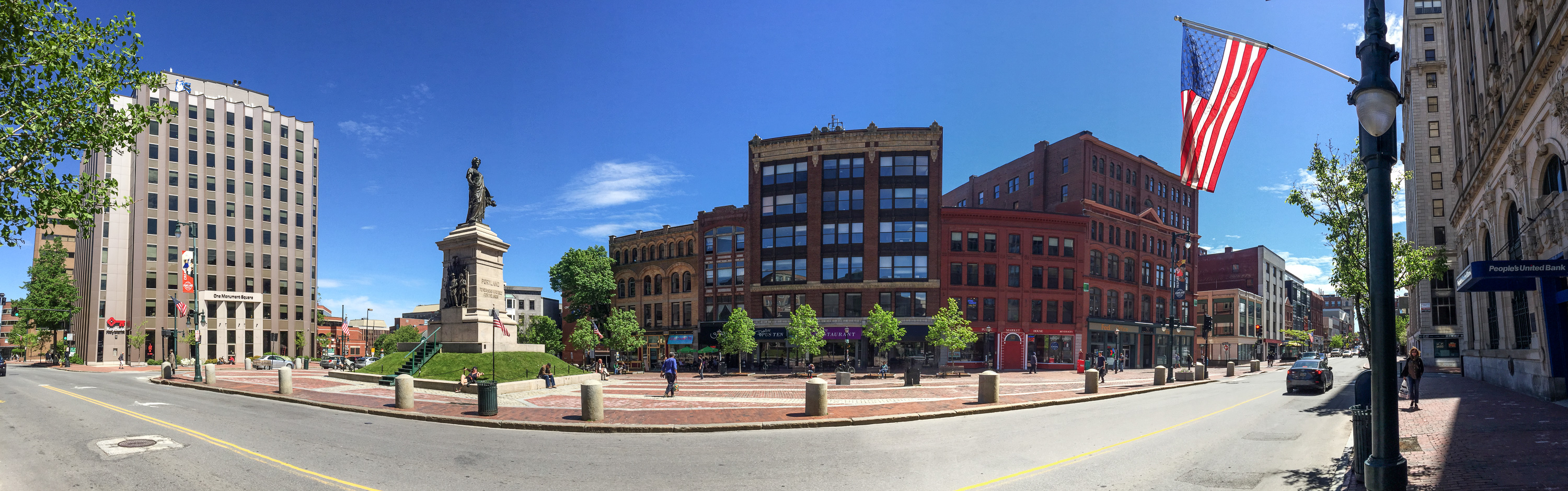
Monument Square pictured in 2017. The Soldiers' and Sailors' Monument now stands on the former site of the original city hall

== Gallery ==
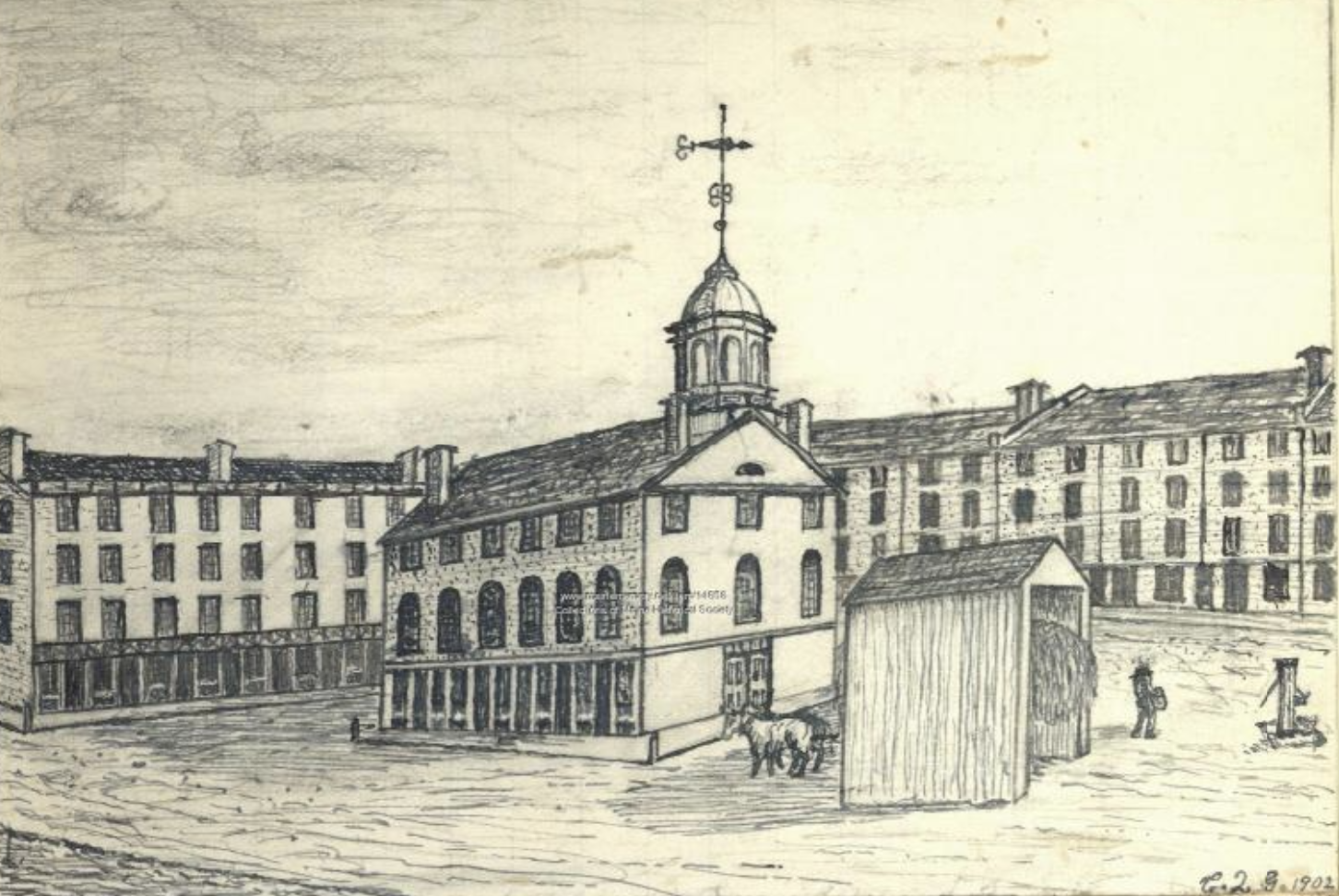
A sketch by Charles Quincy Goodhue (1902) of Market House (c. 1830), which was modified to become the first city hall

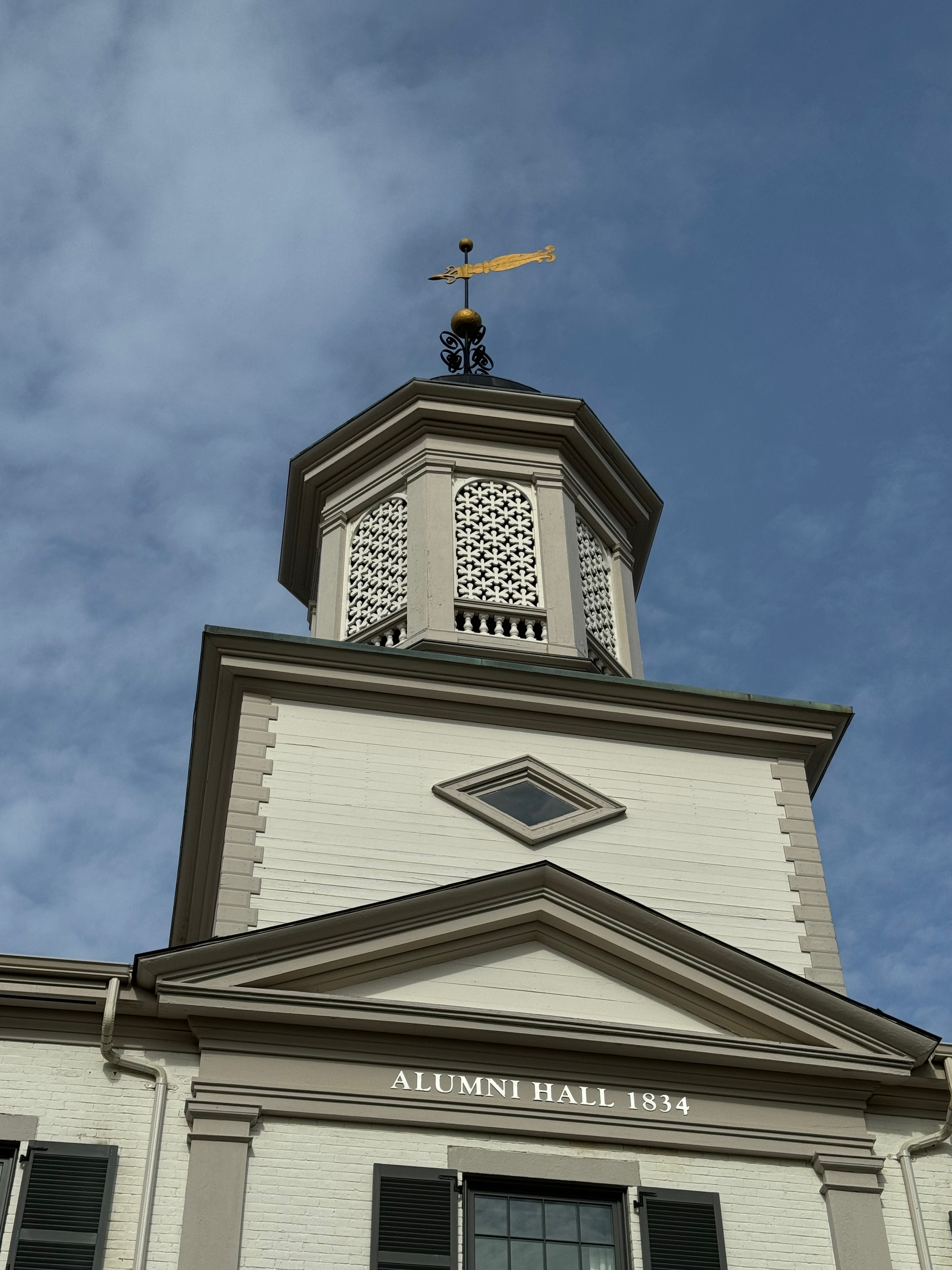
The cupola from Market House, pictured in 2024 on Alumni Hall on the University of New England's Portland campus

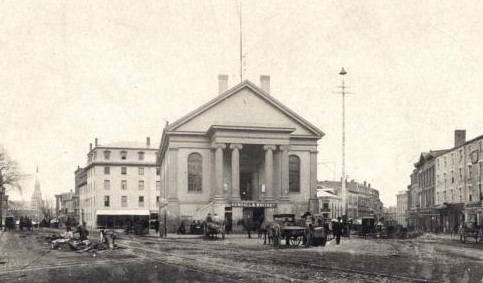
Old City Hall, pictured in 1886, two years before its demolition

== See also ==
- List of mayors of Portland, Maine

== Sources ==
- City of Portland (1940). Portland City Guide. Portland, Maine: The Forest City Printing Company.
- Greater Portland Landmarks (1986). Portland (2nd ed.). Hallowell, Maine: Greater Portland Landmarks, Inc. ISBN 9780939761074.
