= George Henri Desmond =

American architect

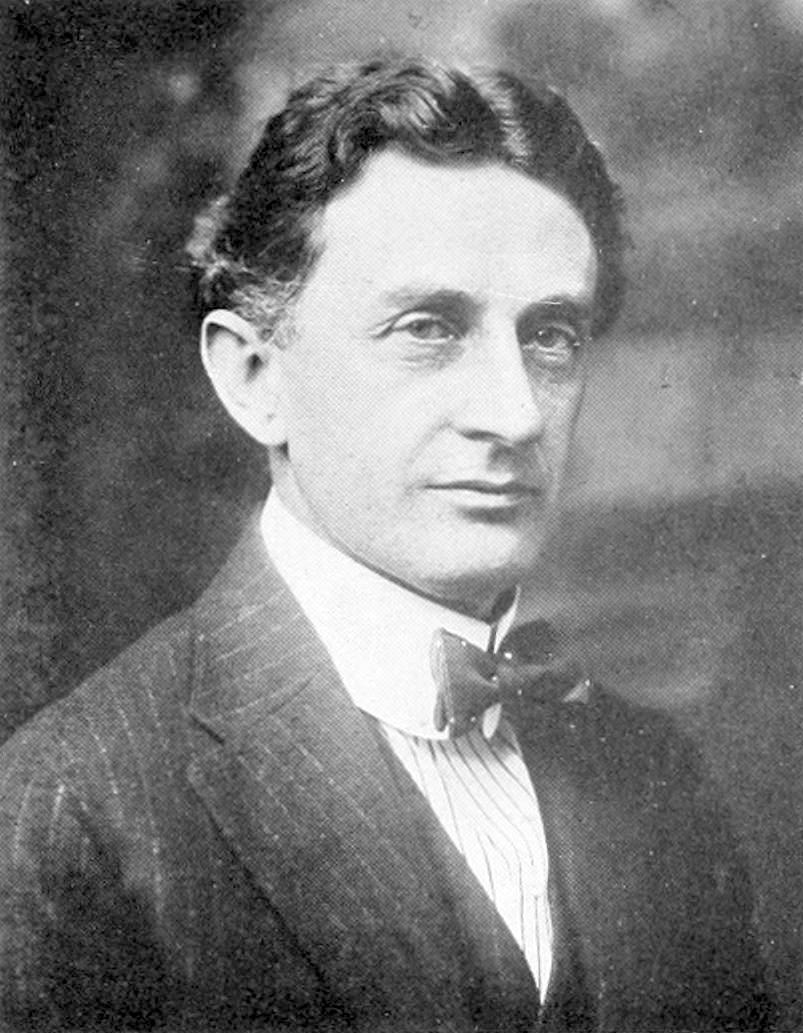
- Desmond pictured around 1916
- Born: February 22, 1874; Watertown, Massachusetts, U.S.
- Died: July 3, 1965 (aged 91); Marblehead Neck, Massachusetts, U.S.
- Occupation: Architect
- Buildings: Fidelity Trust Building

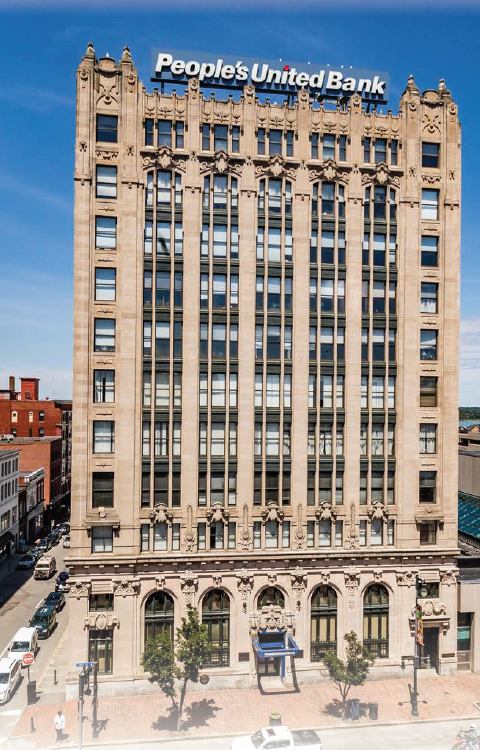
The Fidelity Trust Building (1910) in Portland, the first skyscraper in Maine

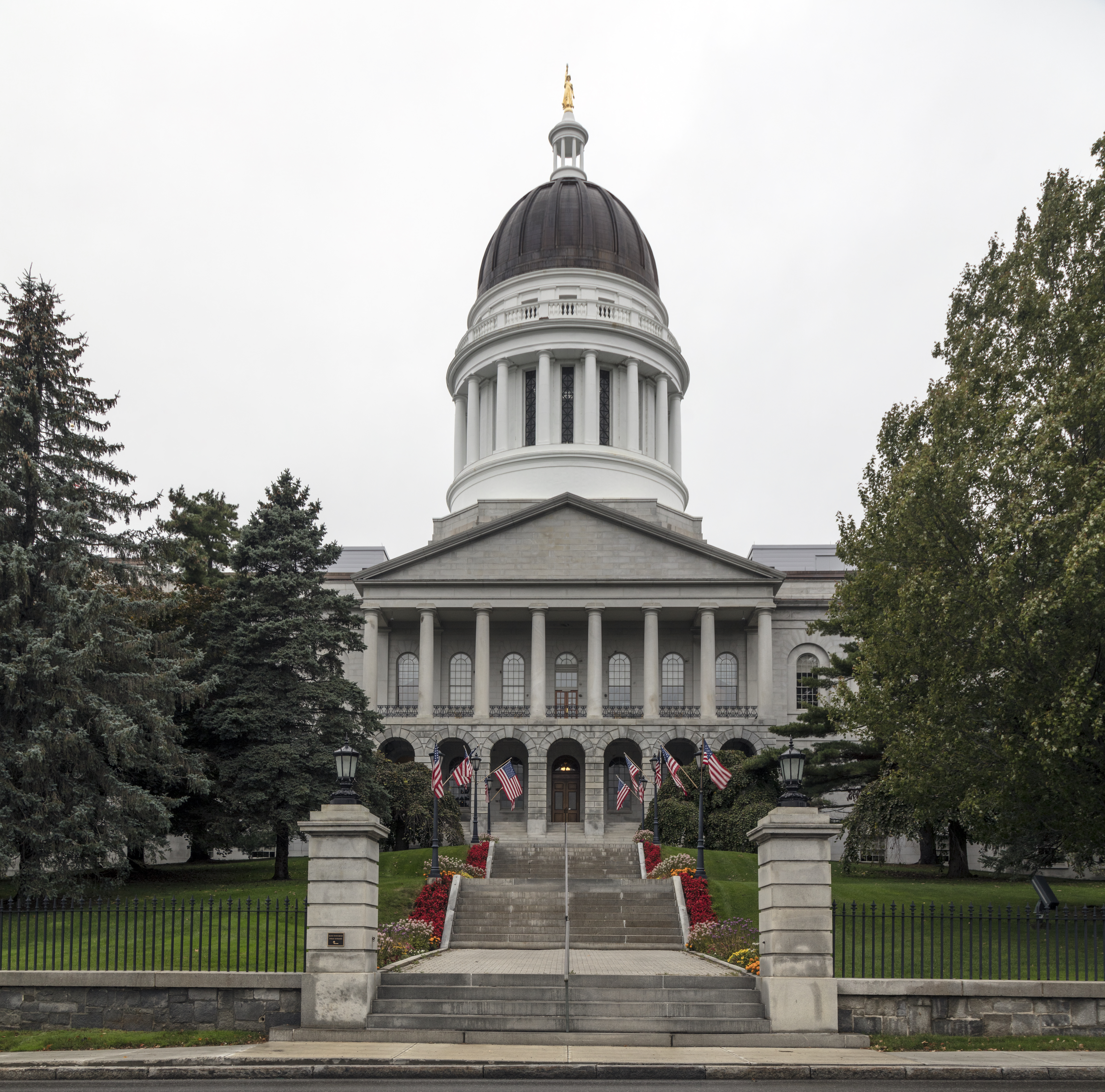
The Maine State House (1910) in Augusta as rebuilt by Desmond

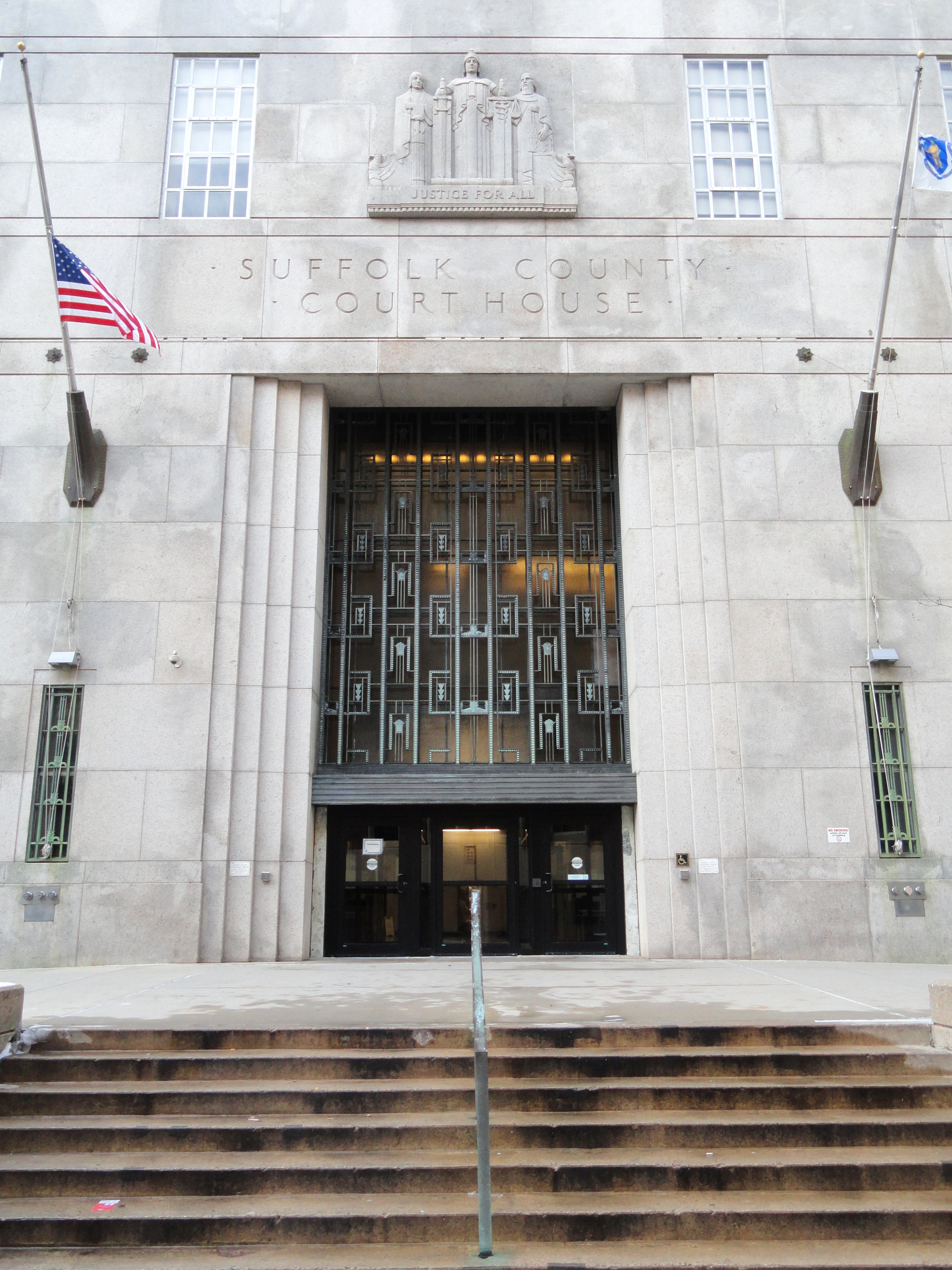
The entrance of the Suffolk County Courthouse (1939) in Boston

George Henri Desmond (commonly known as G. Henri Desmond; February 22, 1874 – July 3, 1965) was an American architect from Watertown, Massachusetts. He designed several notable buildings, including the expanded Maine State House in Augusta, Maine, and the Fidelity Trust Building in Portland, Maine.

== Early life ==
Desmond was born in Watertown, Massachusetts, in 1874, to Dennis Desmond and Mary Ann Fennell. He was educated in the Boston public schools.

== Career ==
In 1910, Desmond designed the Fidelity Trust Building in Portland, Maine, which was the state's first skyscraper. Hugo Kuehne was a draftsman for Desmond.

Desmond was partner in the firm of Desmond & Lord, which he established with Israel P. Lord in 1912. Their office was at 15 Beacon Street, which was the former home of Codman and Despradelle. The vacancy came about after the death of Désiré Despradelle.

In 1916, he was also working for the Boston Park Department.

The Desmond & Lord office moved to 1 Beacon Street in 1928, then to 6 Beacon Street.

Both Desmond and Lord had retired by 1961, but their business continued into the 1970s.

== Architectural works ==
- 1908 – Sterling Inn, Sterling, Massachusetts
- 1909 – Central Fire Station, Chelsea, Massachusetts
- 1909 – Chelsea Trust Company Building, Chelsea, Massachusetts
  - Extant but reclad at an unknown date
- 1910 – Fidelity Trust Building, Portland, Maine
  - Maine's first skyscraper
- 1910 – Maine State House expansion and reconstruction, Augusta, Maine
  - Only the granite walls and portico of Charles Bulfinch's building were preserved; Desmond's redesign doubled the length of the building and added a higher dome and all-new interiors
- 1912 – All Souls Chapel, Poland Spring, Maine
  - NRHP-listed
- 1915 – Elephant House, Franklin Park Zoo, Roxbury, Boston
  - Demolished
- 1915 – Elks' Home, Providence, Rhode Island
  - Demolished
- 1918 – Portland High School, Portland, Maine
  - Designed by Miller & Mayo, architects, with G. Henri Desmond, associate architect; NRHP-listed
- 1921 – Hyde Park Municipal Building, Hyde Park, Boston
- 1923 – Clapp Memorial Building, Portland, Maine
- 1923 – Press Herald Building, Portland, Maine
- 1927 – Omni Parker House, Boston
- 1931 – Winter Hill Cooperative Bank Building, Somerville, Massachusetts
  - Built for the use of the Highland Trust Company, Somerville Institution for Savings and the Winter Hill Cooperative Bank, of which only the latter survived the Great Depression
- 1937 – Malden High School, Malden, Massachusetts
- 1939 – Calvin Coolidge Bridge, Connecticut River, Northampton and Hadley, Massachusetts
  - Designed by Maurice A. Reidy, consulting engineer, with Desmond & Lord, architects
- 1939 – Suffolk County Courthouse, Boston
- 1949 – Roosevelt Towers, Cambridge, Massachusetts
- 1949 – St. Ignatius of Loyola Catholic Church, Chestnut Hill, Massachusetts
- 1949 – White Stadium, Franklin Park, Roxbury, Boston
- 1956 – Burton M. Cross Building, Augusta, Maine
  - Designed by Miller & Beal, Inc., architects, with Desmond & Lord, associate architects
- 1962 – Furcolo Hall, University of Massachusetts Amherst, Amherst, Massachusetts

== Personal life ==
In 1903, Desmond married Maud Vasti Hollis, a native of New York, with whom he had one child: son George Henri Desmond Jr. The family lived at the corner of Braemore Road and Commonwealth Avenue in Boston, in a house which Desmond designed. Desmond became a widower in 1938, but it is not known if he remarried.

He was a member of the Boston Art Club, Boston Real Estate Exchange, the Point Shirley Club and the Cumberland Club in Portland, Maine.

== Death ==
After retiring, Desmond moved to Marblehead Neck, Massachusetts. He died in Salem, Massachusetts, in 1965 at the age of 91. He was interred in Mount Auburn Cemetery in Cambridge, Massachusetts.

== See also ==
- List of American architects
