= United States Hotel (Portland, Maine) =

Hotel in Portland, Maine

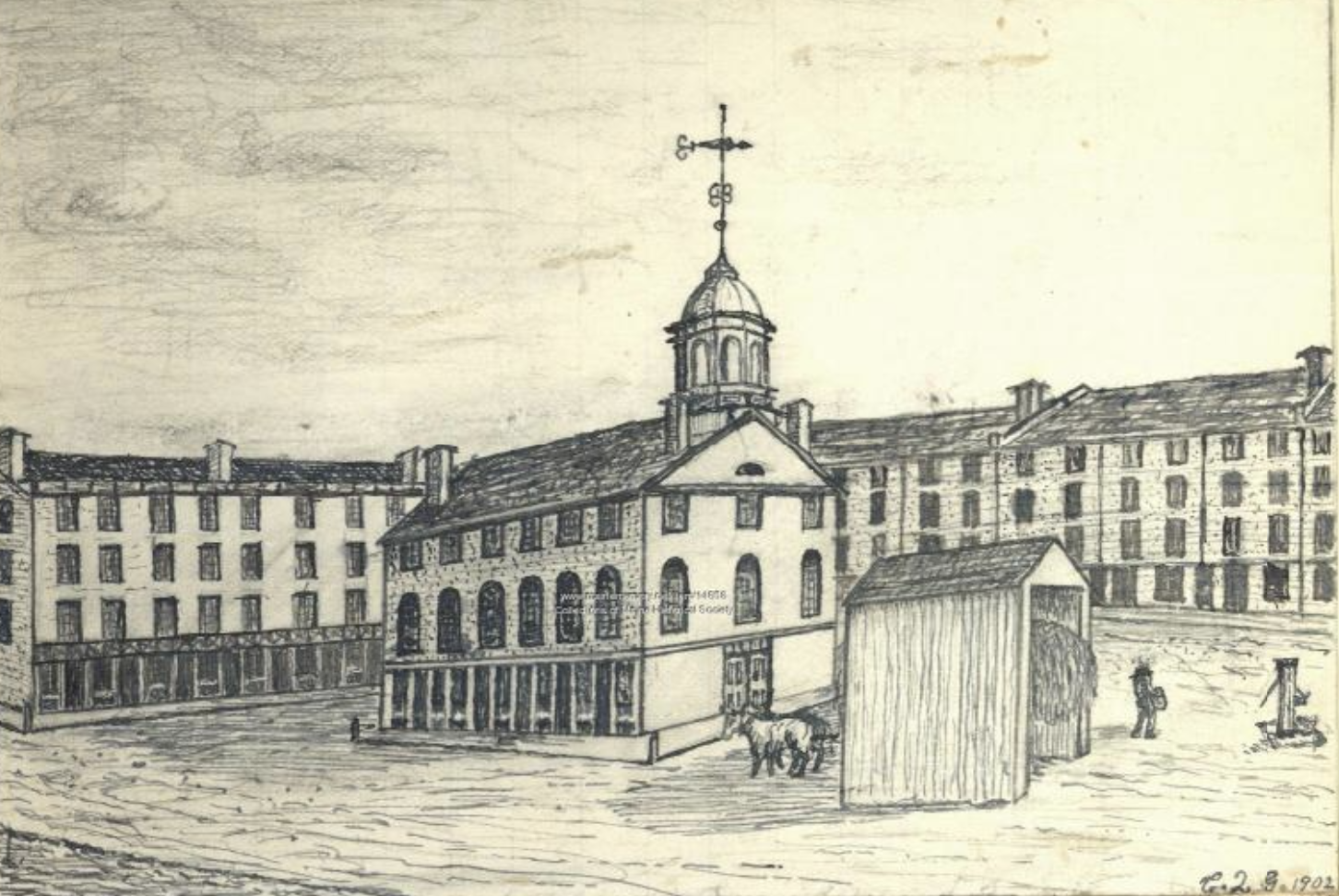
- The hotel, left, behind Market House, which was modified in 1833 to become the first Portland City Hall. The hotel was known as the Portland House when this c. 1830 sketch was made by Charles Quincy Goodhue
- Interactive map of the United States Hotel area
- Former names: Washington Hall Hotel; Cumberland Hotel; Portland House; Cumberland House

General information
- Status: Demolished
- Type: Hotel
- Location: Federal Street, Haymarket Square
- Coordinates: 43.6575°N 70.2586°W
- Completed: 1803 (223 years ago)
- Closed: 1900 (126 years ago)
- Demolished: 1965 (61 years ago)

Technical details
- Floor count: 5

Other information
- Number of rooms: 150

The United States Hotel was a hotel in Portland, Maine. At the time of its closure, in 1900, it was one of the oldest hotels in the city, having been in business for 97 years. The hotel stood on Federal Street, behind Market House (built in 1825; later modified to become Portland's original city hall), in what was then known as Haymarket Square. Built by Dr. Nathaniel Coffin in 1803 as the Washington Hall Hotel, it was later renamed the Cumberland Hotel. It was renamed again, around 1829, to the Portland House, then the Cumberland House in 1835.

At the time of its opening, the hotel had eighteen parlors and 57 bedrooms. It had 150 rooms at its peak, and was listed as one of three principal hotels in Maine in The United States Statistical Directory, Or, Merchants' and Travellers' Guide (1847), the others being the American House (at the corner of Fore Street and Lime Street) and Casco Temperance House (on Middle Street). Elm Tavern (also on Federal Street) and Cape Cottage (on Cape Elizabeth) joined the ranks in 1850.

Two United States presidents stayed at the hotel: James K. Polk (then in-office) in 1846 and Millard Fillmore in 1855. Bill Hickock was also a guest.

The hotel underwent extensive remodeling in 1875, including the addition of a fifth floor, telegraph services for its guests, a reading room, a billiard room and supplementary bathrooms. In 1880, a livery stable was advertised as being connected to the hotel.

In 1891, by which time Haymarket Square had been renamed Monument Square, the ground floor of the hotel was occupied by M. T. Quimby & Co. jewelers.

The hotel's proprietors included Foss and O'Connor, R. W. Carter, George F. Wolcott, and Will H. McDonald.

The hotel closed in 1900, and the building became Edwards and Walker hardware store, prior to the building's demolition in December 1965. The new construction, completed in 1969, was originally the home of Casco Bank. It is the home of One Monument Square today. A plaque in front of the current building denotes the site as the former location of the hotel.

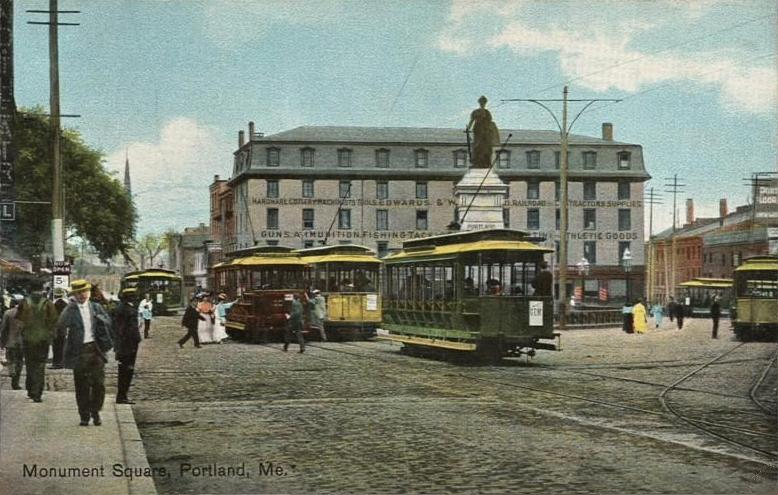
A 1909 view showing streetcars of the Portland Railroad Company

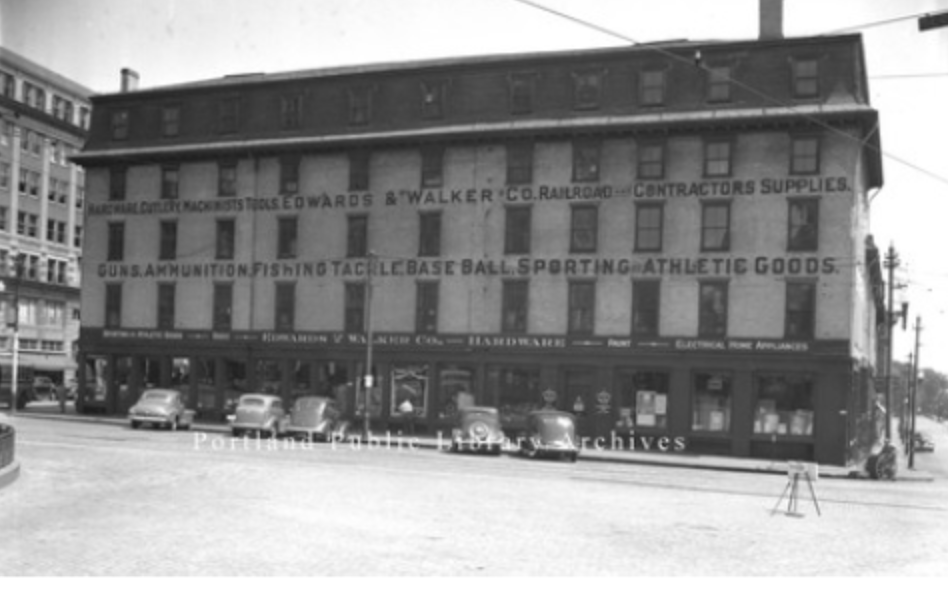
The building in 1941, when it was the home of Edwards and Walker hardware store

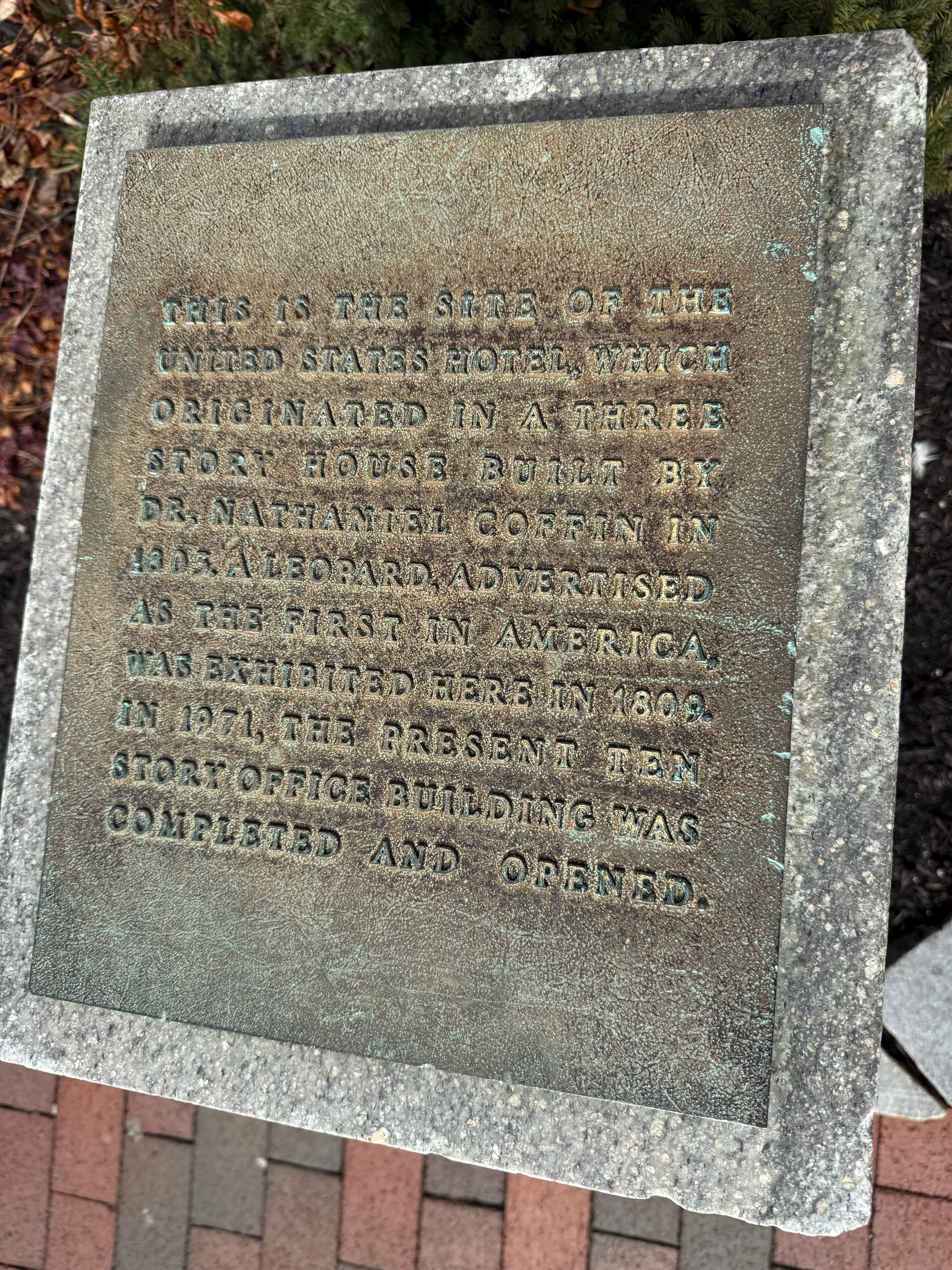
Plaque at the site
