= Monument Square (Portland, Maine) =

Town square in downtown Portland, Maine

- Market Square (former); Haymarket Square (former)
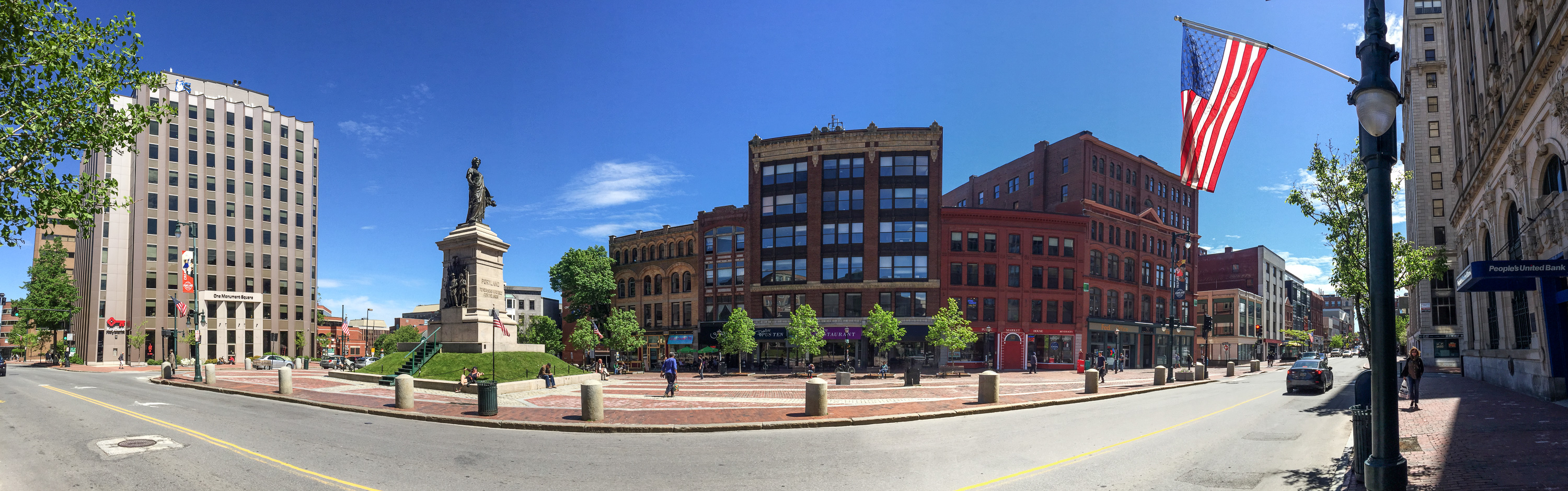
- The square in 2017, viewed from Congress Street
- Interactive map of Monument Square
- Maintained by: City of Portland
- Location: Portland, Maine, U.S.
- Coordinates: 43.657342°N 70.258924°W

Monument Square (formerly Market Square or Haymarket Square) is a town square in downtown Portland, Maine, about halfway between the East Bayside and Old Port neighborhoods. One Monument Square and One City Center are among the buildings on the square itself, while the Time and Temperature Building, Fidelity Trust Building and the main branch of the Portland Public Library are on Congress Street, across from the square.

Until the 20th century, Middle Street originated from Market Square. It ran east through where The Maine Lobsterman statue is today, before continuing its current route from its intersection with Temple, Spring and Union Streets. The original stretch, which formerly met Federal Street in the square, is now paved with bricks and is no longer Middle Street.

== Constituent buildings ==
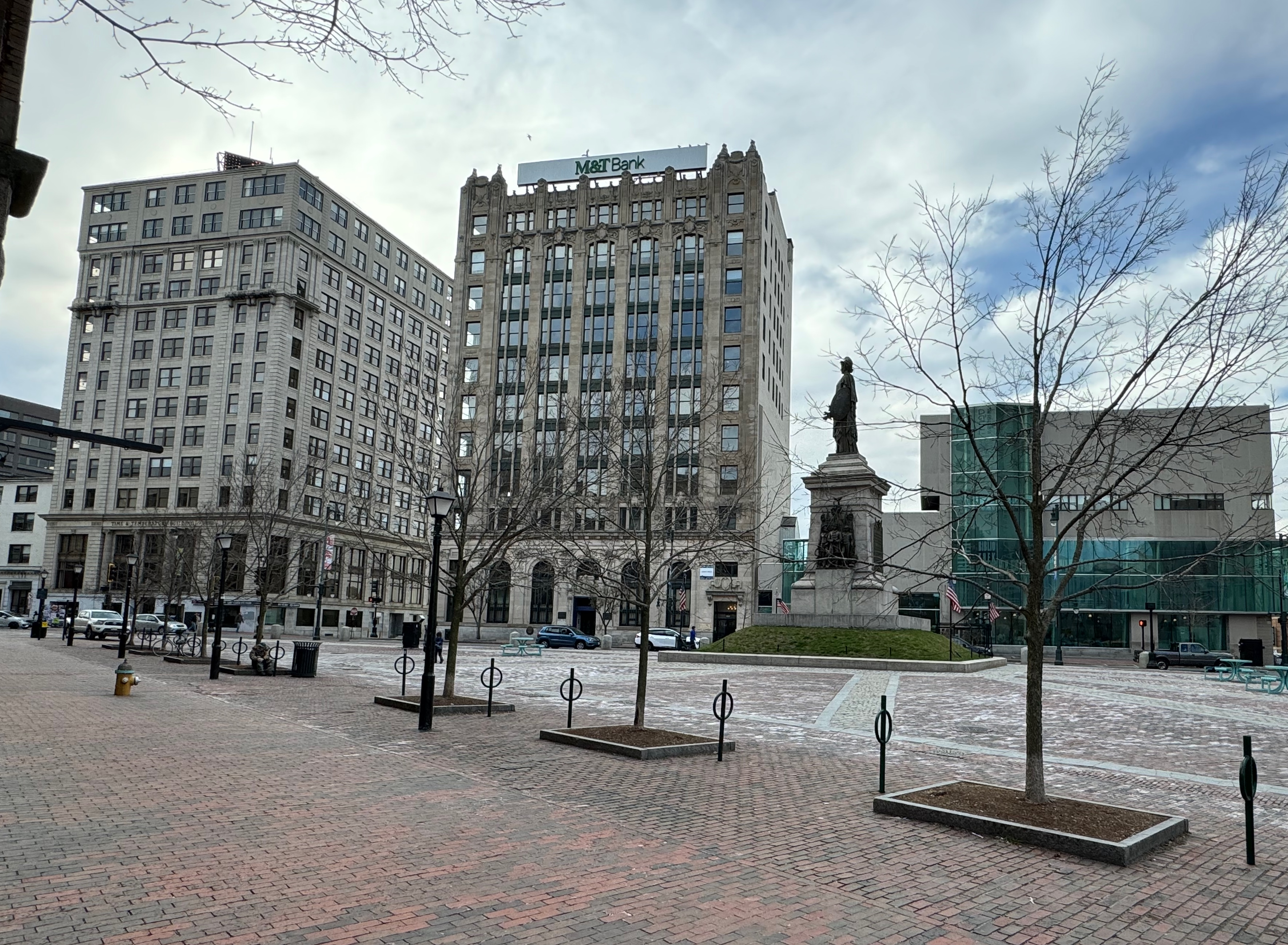
A 2024 view of Congress Street from Monument Square, including the Time and Temperature Building (left) and the M&T Bank Building

One Monument Square, a ten-story office building on the eastern edge of the square, was built on the site of the United States Hotel. Tenants at its November 1970 opening included the law firms Bernstein, Shur, Sawyer & Nelson and Pierce, Atwood, Scribner, Allen, Smith & Lancaster, and Amica Mutual Insurance. The building was renovated in 2015.

28 Monument Square was built in 1871. In 2006, the first floor and basement of the building became the home of Public Market House, whose several vendors flank a narrow central corridor. Some vendors moved to Public Market House from the nearby Portland Public Market building, at the corner of Preble Street and Cumberland Avenue, which closed earlier in the year.

=== Old City Hall ===
In 1825, the Town of Portland built Market House in Market Square to facilitate the sale produce and livestock. In 1833, the structure was modified to serve as Portland's first city hall. In 1862, it was replaced by a new city hall, located on Congress Street at the head of Exchange Street. The old city hall was demolished in 1888 and replaced by the Soldiers' and Sailors' Monument, at which time Market Square was renamed Monument Square.

=== Portland Soldiers and Sailors Monument ===
The Soldiers' and Sailors' Monument (also known as "Our Lady of Victories") stands in the center of Monument Square, on the former site of Portland's 1833 city hall. Dedicated on October 28, 1891, it honors "those brave men of Portland, soldiers of the United States Army and sailors of the Navy of the United States who died in defense of the country in the late civil war". It was added to the National Register of Historic Places on April 1, 1998.

== Gallery ==
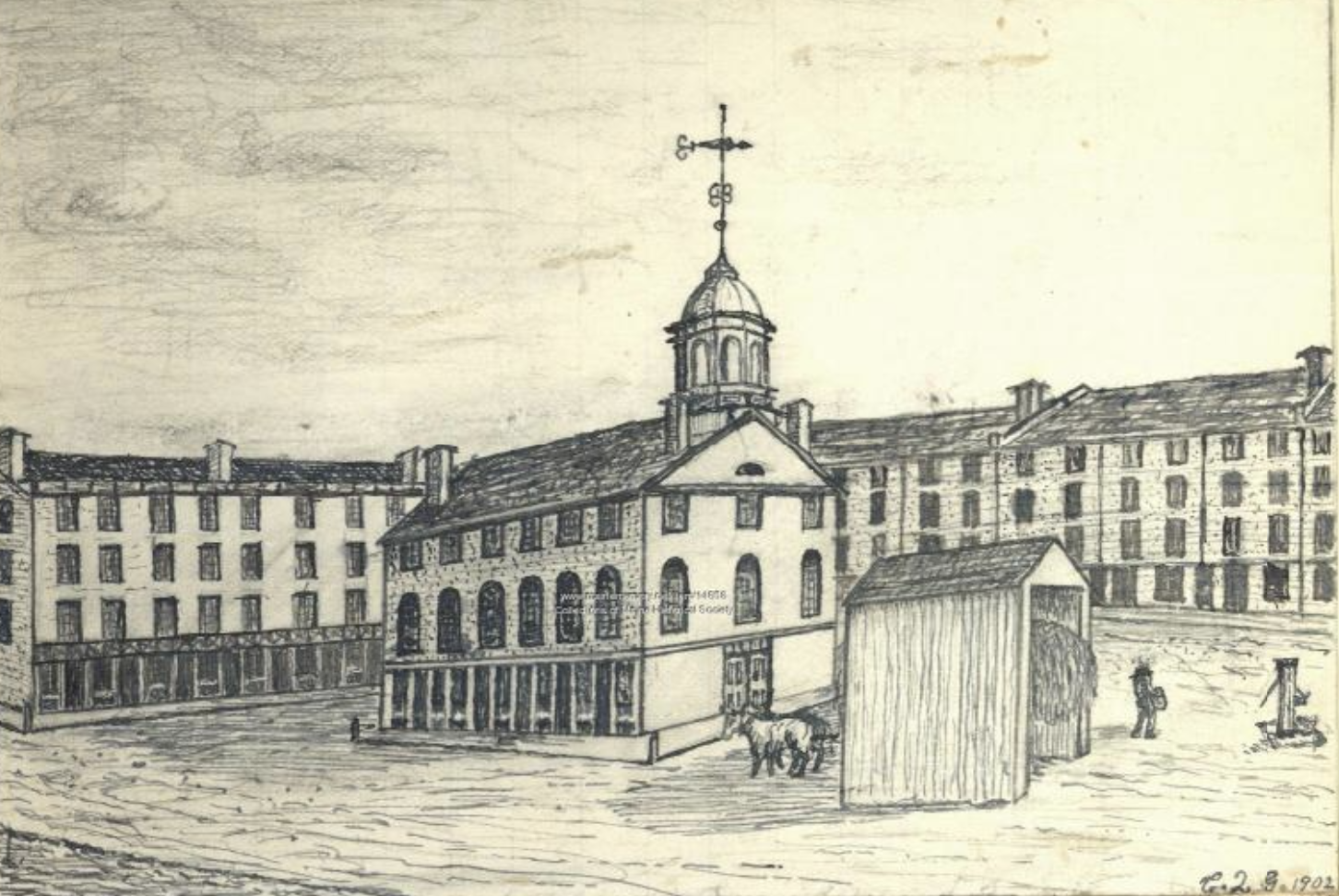
A 1902 sketch by Charles Quincy Goodhue of Market House (c. 1830), which was modified in 1833 to become the first city hall

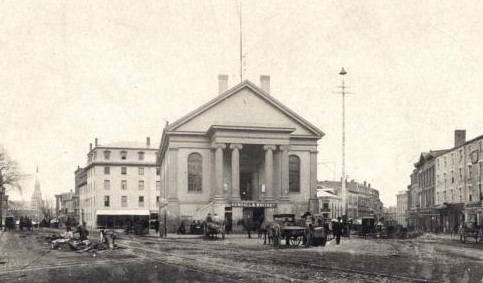
1833 city hall (with the United States Hotel behind) in 1886. It was demolished 1888 and replaced by today's Soldiers and Sailors Monument

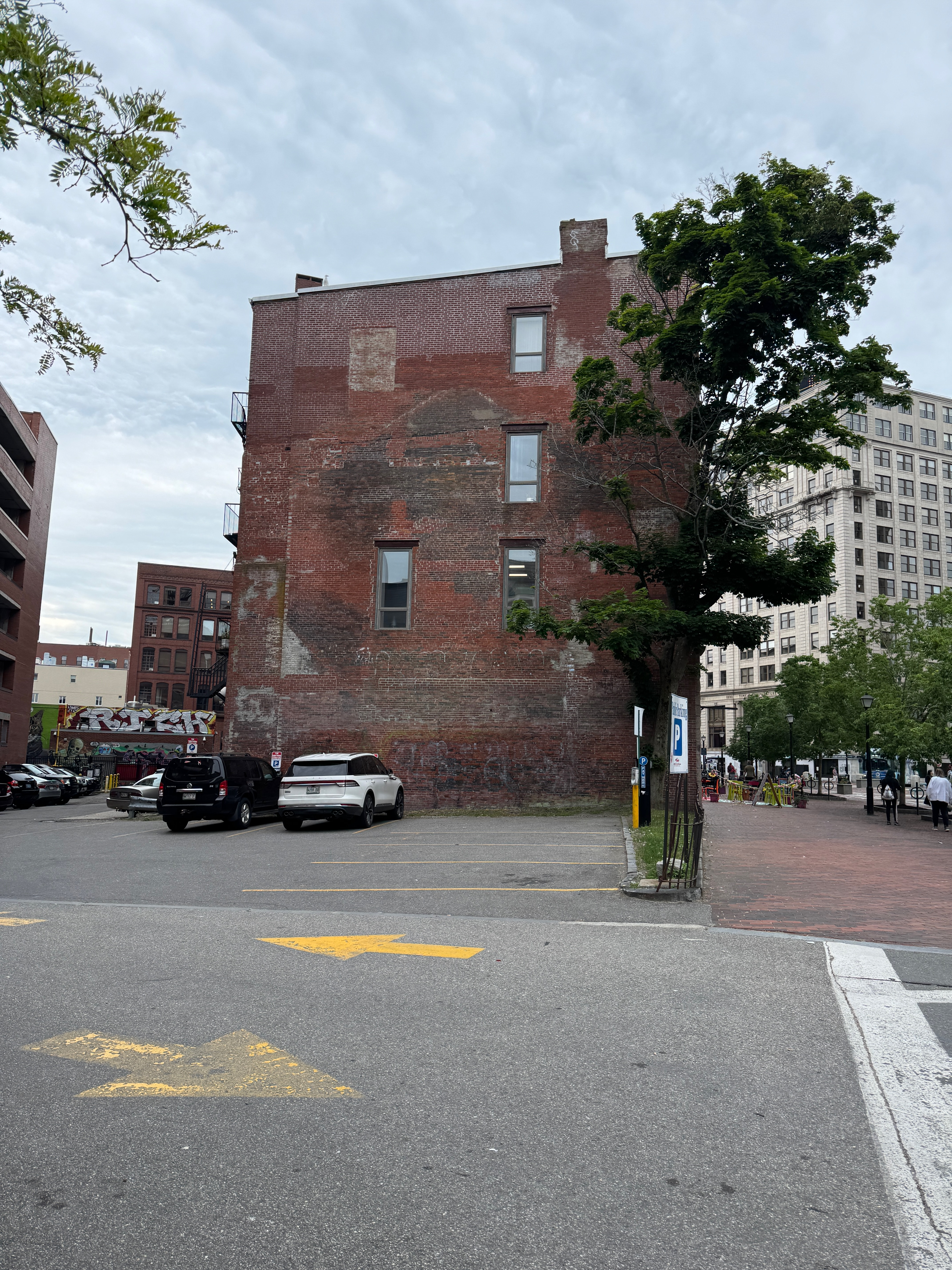
Remnants of a building, formerly attached to 15 Monument Square, demolished to make way for the entrance to One City Center parking garage

== See also ==
- Portland Railroad Company
- National Register of Historic Places listings in Portland, Maine
- United States Hotel
