= Time and Temperature Building =

Office building in Portland, Maine, United States

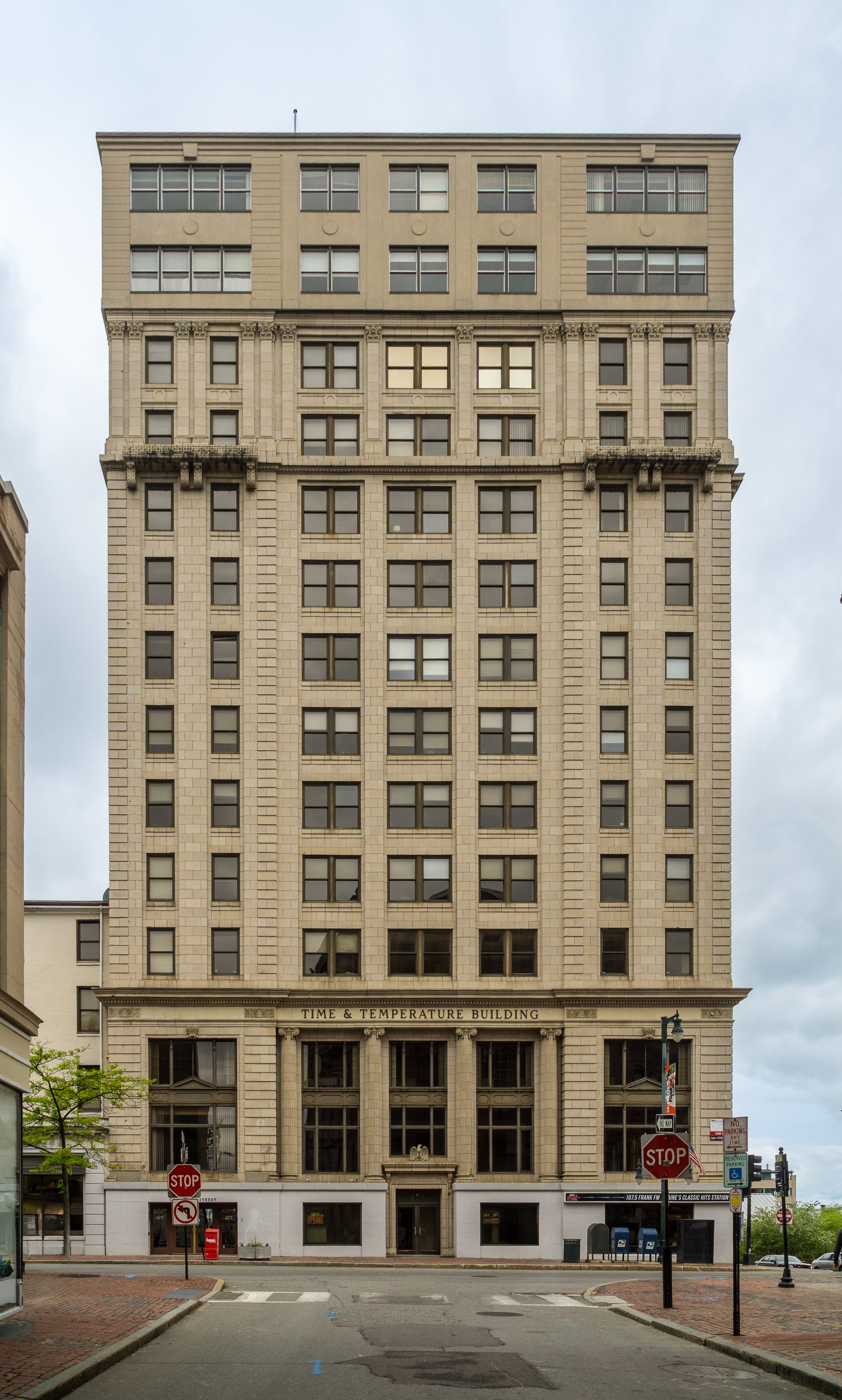
- The building viewed from Center Street

- Location within Maine
- Former names: Chapman Building

General information
- Type: High-rise building
- Architectural style: Neoclassical
- Location: Portland, Maine, United States, 477 Congress Street
- Coordinates: 43°39′26″N 70°15′36″W
- Completed: 1924 (102 years ago)
- Renovated: 1996
- Owner: TT Maine Venture LLC

Height
- Height: 184 ft (56 m)

Technical details
- Floor count: 14
- Lifts/elevators: 3

Design and construction
- Architect: Herbert W. Rhodes

The Time and Temperature Building, originally known as the Chapman Building, and officially 477 Congress Street, is a 14-story office building on Congress Street in downtown Portland, Maine. The building, which replaced Preble House (a successor to the mansion of Commodore Edward Preble), is named after a large three-sided four-element eggcrate display screen on the roof that flashes the local time and temperature. It was built in 1924 as a 12-story building, with Maine's first indoor shopping center on its ground floor. It sits across Preble Street from the 10-story Fidelity Trust Building. Until the 1970s, these buildings were Portland's only skyscrapers.

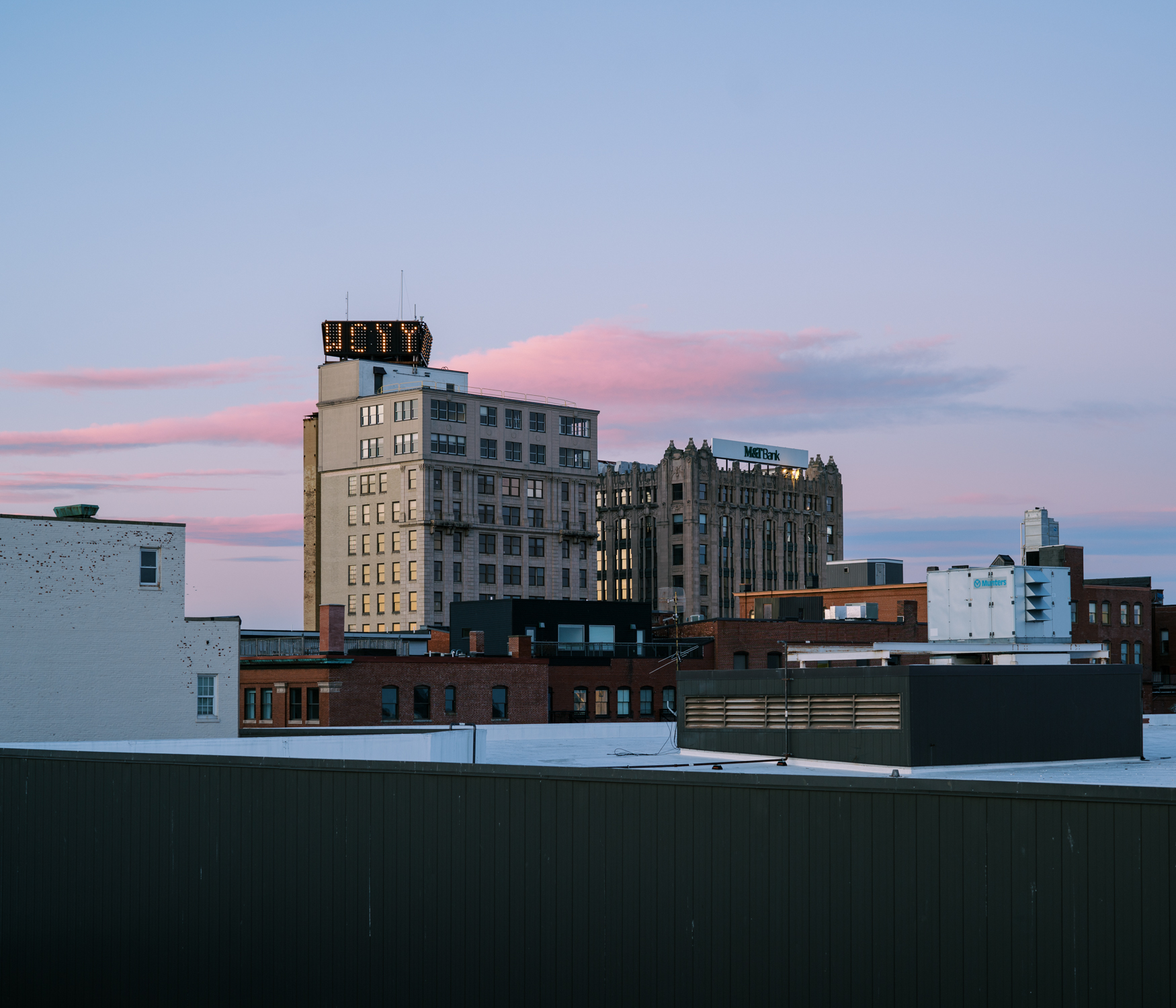
The Time & Temperature Building viewed from the roof of Spring Street Parking Garage.

The building, one of Portland's tallest, is visible from miles away, including from Peaks Island across the harbor, and it has become a landmark to Portlanders who depend on it for the sign's time and temperature, but also mariners sailing into Portland harbor.

== Time and temperature sign ==
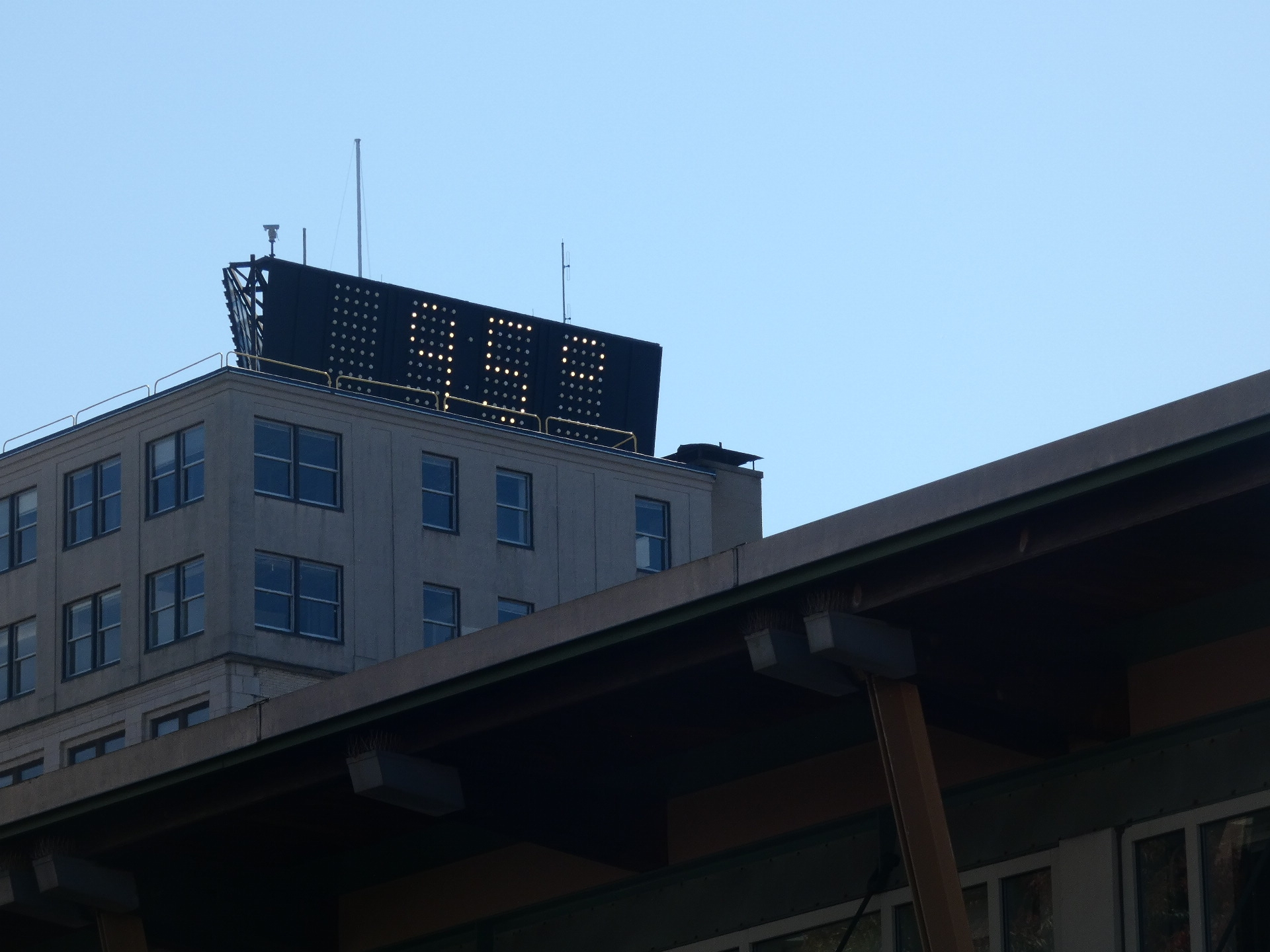
The sign displaying the temperature

The time-and-temperature sign was added to the building in 1964. In the 1970s, the Portland Savings Bank ran a summertime competition to guess when the sign would first register a temperature of 90 °F (32 °C).

Maine law prohibits flashing messages on signs visible from state highways, but in 1991, the Maine Legislature passed a grandfather clause exemption to allow the Time and Temperature building to use advertising to cover operating costs. A new sign was installed in 1999, which as well as the time and temperature, broadcasts messages consisting of two lines, each with four characters. Advertising messages have included "WMTW NEWS", from television station WMTW-TV, whose studios were located in the building from 1999 until 2015, and "CALL JOE", from advertising lawyer Joe Bornstein. When a snowstorm is severe enough to result in a snow emergency, the sign flashes the words "PARK BAN", to remind people not to park on the street.

In 2010, when a malfunction resulted in the sign going dark, around 60 concerned people contacted the building's owners to let them know.

== History ==
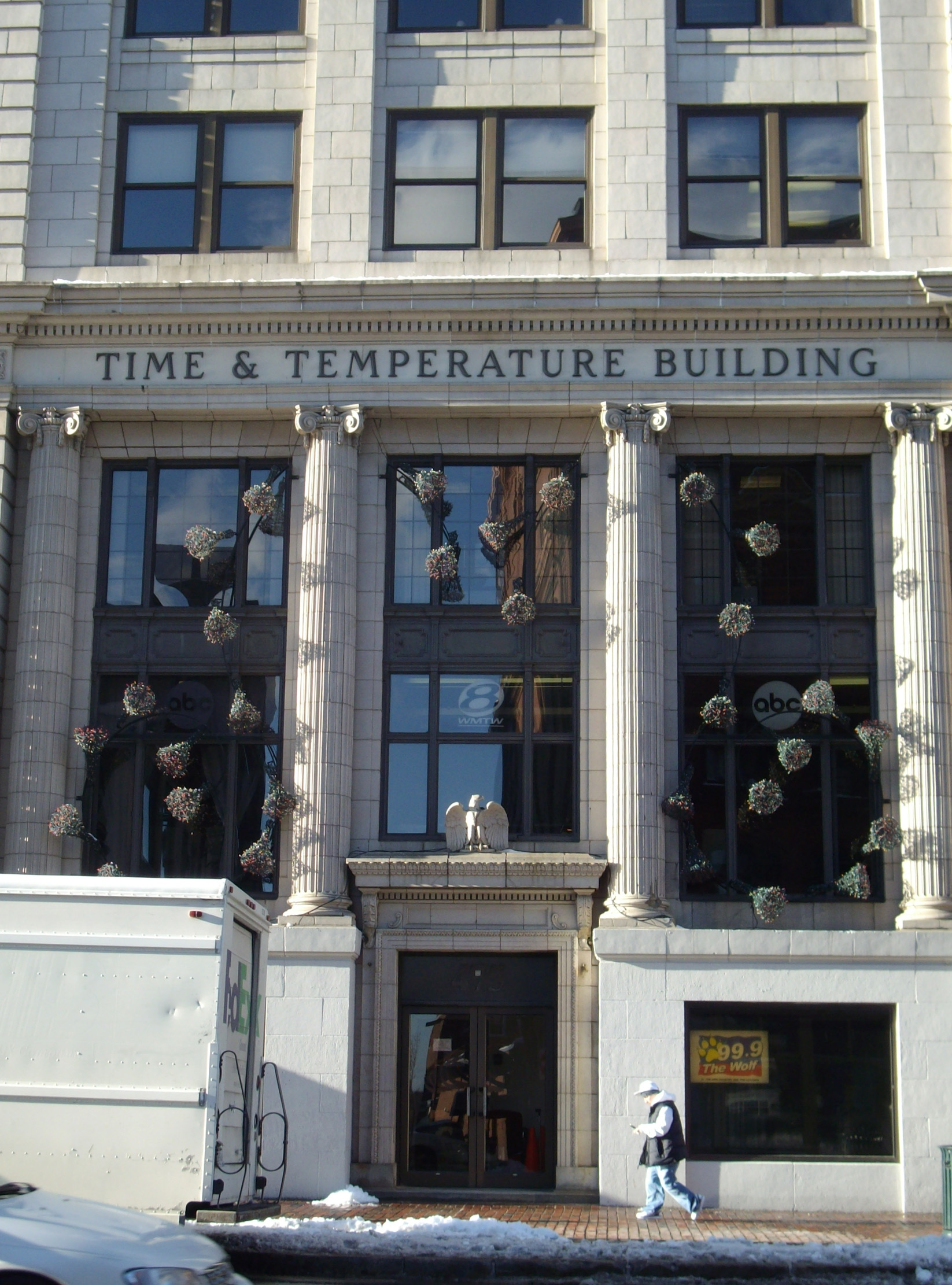
Entrance to the Time and Temperature Building

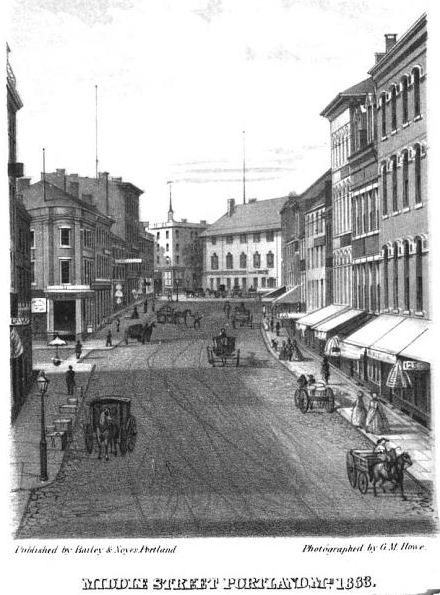
The predecessors to both the Time and Temperature Building and, across Preble Street, the Fidelity Trust Building are in view in this 1863 view of Middle Street

The Chapman Building was designed by local architect Herbert W. Rhodes, who also designed the nearby hotel The Eastland. In 1964, Casco Bank, the owner of the building, added two stories, and installed a flashing time-and-temperature sign on the roof. The addition was incongruent with the original style of the building, but a major renovation in the 1980s more naturally integrated it into the lower floors.

In 1995, millionaire philanthropist Elizabeth Noyce's Libra Foundation purchased the building. Renovations were completed in 1996, and a new time-and-temperature sign was installed on the roof in 1999. In 2003, the Libra Foundation sold the building to 477 Congress LLC, a subsidiary of Kalmon Dolgin Affiliates. By 2016, occupancy dropped to 60%, as lack of maintenance had caused tenants to vacate the building. The building was taken into foreclosure by Wells Fargo on May 11, 2016. Building ownership passed to CW Capital Asset Management, a loan servicing company. An inspection in November 2017 by the Portland Fire Department found 19 fire-safety violations. The building was sold at auction for $9.3 million in October 2018 to TT Maine Venture.

In 2019, it was sold to Chris Rhoades and Drew Preston. In 2023, Rhoades said removing the historic designation from the former Children's Museum at 142 Free Street could jeopardize historic tax credits needed to build 250 affordable apartments in the building. That same year the planned conversion of the building into a hotel was put on hold due to labor shortages.

In 2025, Kevin Bunker of Developers Collaborative announced plans to convert the annex of the building into 41 units of affordable senior housing. The project was supported by $2.6 million in affordable housing funds from MaineHousing.
