= Market House (Portland, Maine) =

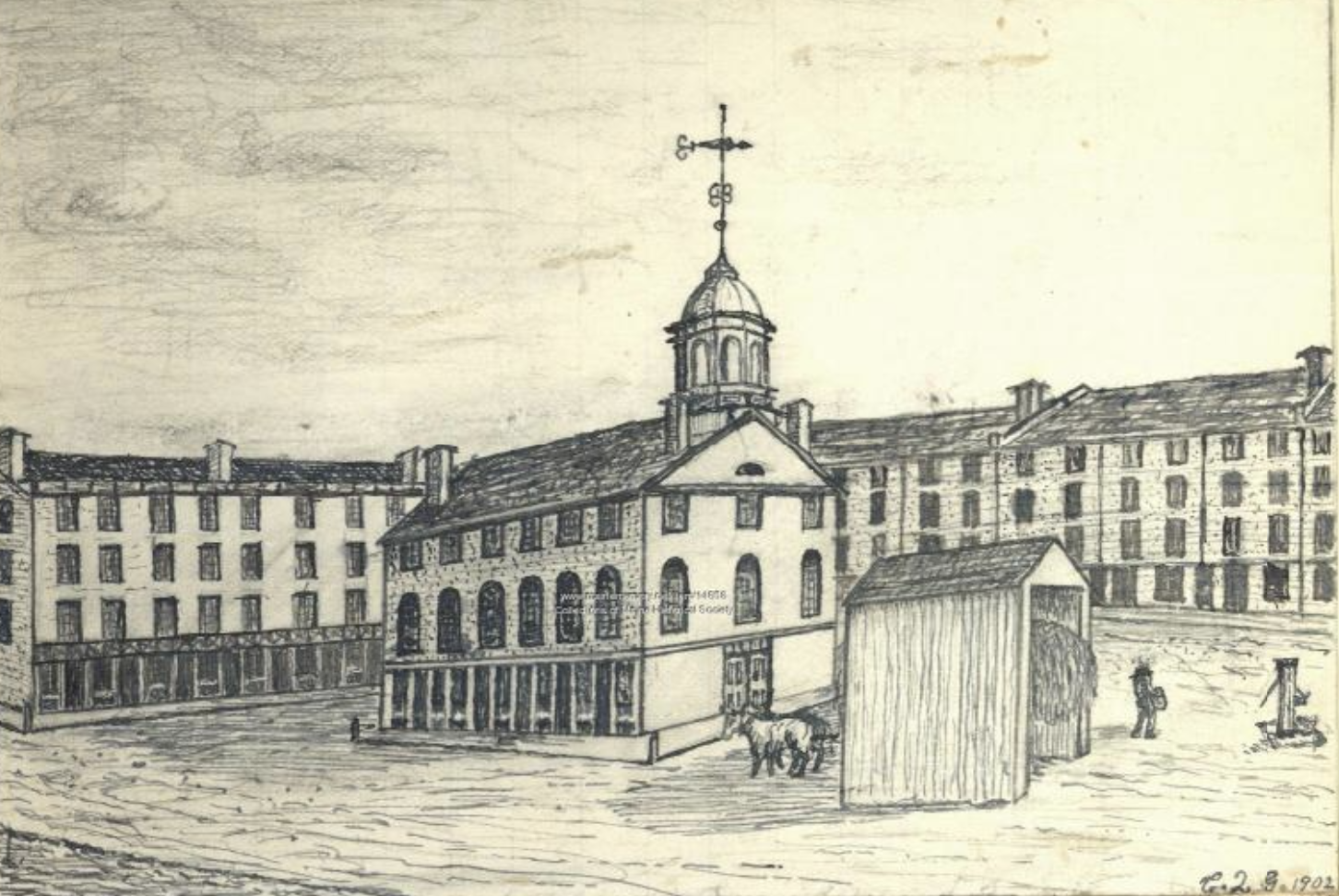
- A 1902 sketch by Charles Quincy Goodhue of the market house (c. 1830), around three years before its 1833 modification to become Portland's first city hall

- Shown in Maine
- 43.65738°N 70.25891°W
- Location: Haymarket Square, Portland, Maine

History
- Built: 1825
- Demolished: 1888 (138 years ago)

The Market House of Portland, Maine, was located in what was then known as Market Square or Haymarket Square (today's Monument Square) between 1825 and 1888, when it was demolished. In 1833, the building was modified to become Portland's first city hall. The Soldiers' and Sailors' Monument, which now stands in its place, was dedicated in 1891.

== History ==
The Town of Portland built a market house in Market (or Haymarket) Square 1825. It was designed in the Federal style by architect-builder John Kimball Jr. Also known as Military Hall, the first floor in the building's early years housed stalls used by farmers to sell agricultural products. In 1827, the upper floor housed the second public gymnasium in the country, founded by eccentric and influential writer, critic, and activist John Neal. The gym was based on Turnen gymnastics, which Neal learned in London from Carl Voelker, a German refugee. It was Maine's first organized athletic program, making Neal the "father of athletics in Maine" according to historian William Barry. Called the Portland Gymnasium, it had 300 members by 1828.

The building's simple gable appearance was modified in 1833, to plans made the previous year by Charles Quincy Clapp, to become Portland's first city hall. Clapp updated the building to the Greek Revival style by removing the cupola from the roof and adding a portico to the front. The cupola was reinstalled on the Universalist school house (now Alumni Hall on the University of New England campus) in Portland's Deering neighborhood.

The new building was the site of the 1855 Portland Rum Riot, which involved mayor Neal Dow and led to one death.

The United States Hotel, built in 1803, stood behind both iterations of the building.

28 Monument Square was built in 1871. In 2006, the first floor and basement of the building became the home of Public Market House, in which several vendors flank a narrow central corridor. Some vendors relocated to Public Market House from the nearby Portland Public Market building, at the corner of Preble Street and Cumberland Avenue, which closed earlier the same year.

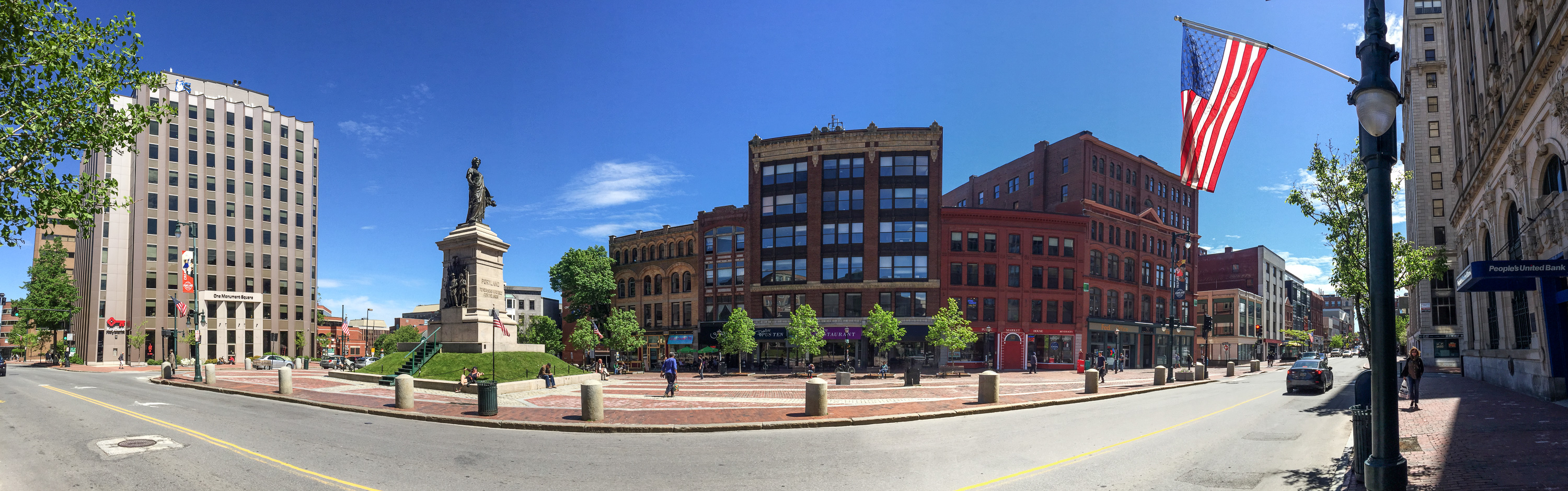
Monument Square pictured in 2017. The Soldiers' and Sailors' Monument now stands on the former site of the Market House. Portland's current Public Market House is on the right

== Gallery ==
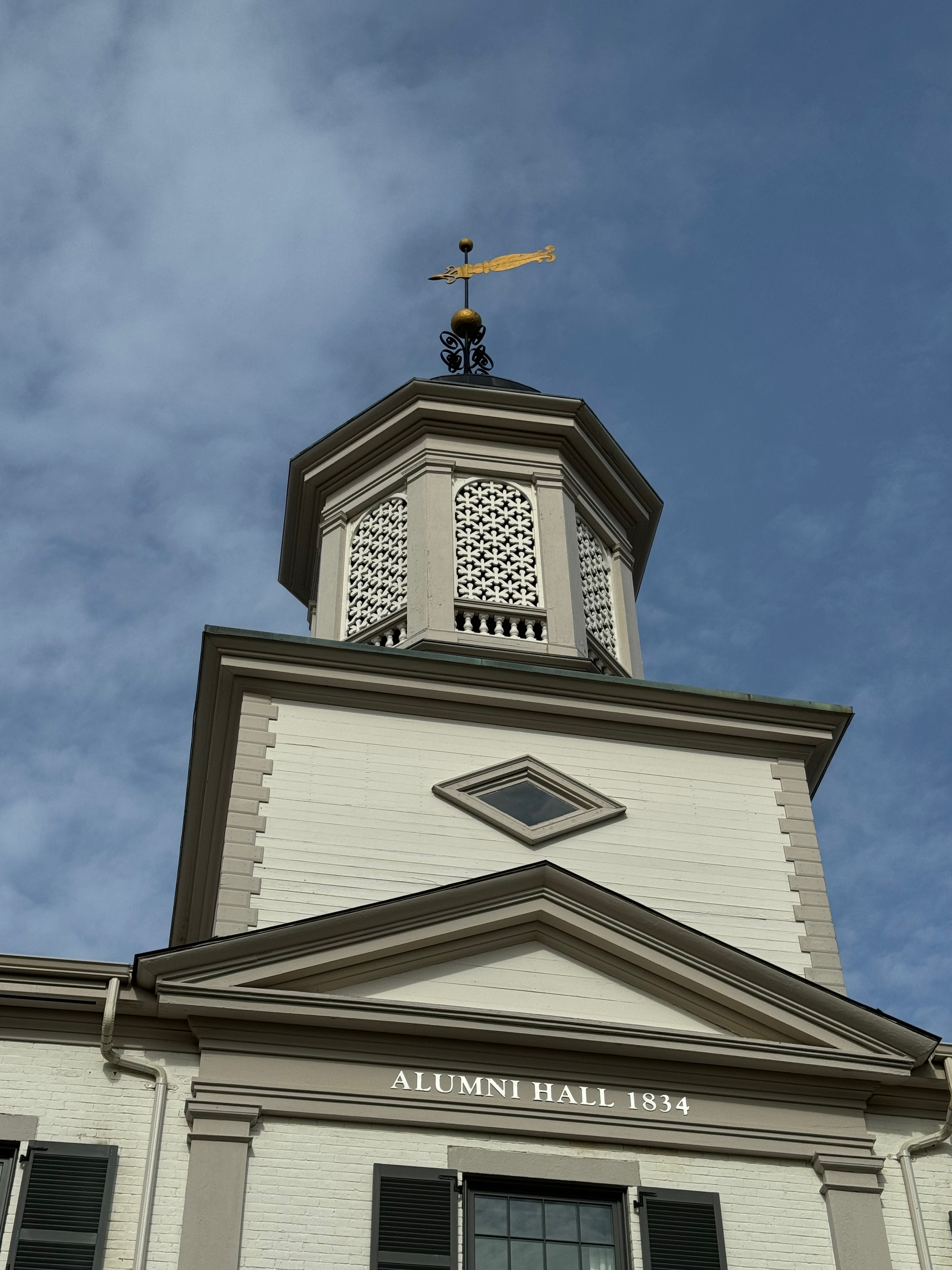
The cupola from the market house, pictured in 2024 on Alumni Hall on the University of New England's Portland campus

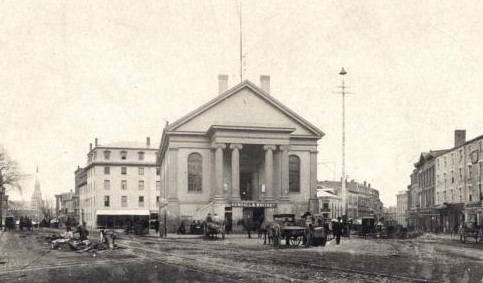
Old City Hall, pictured in 1886, two years before its demolition

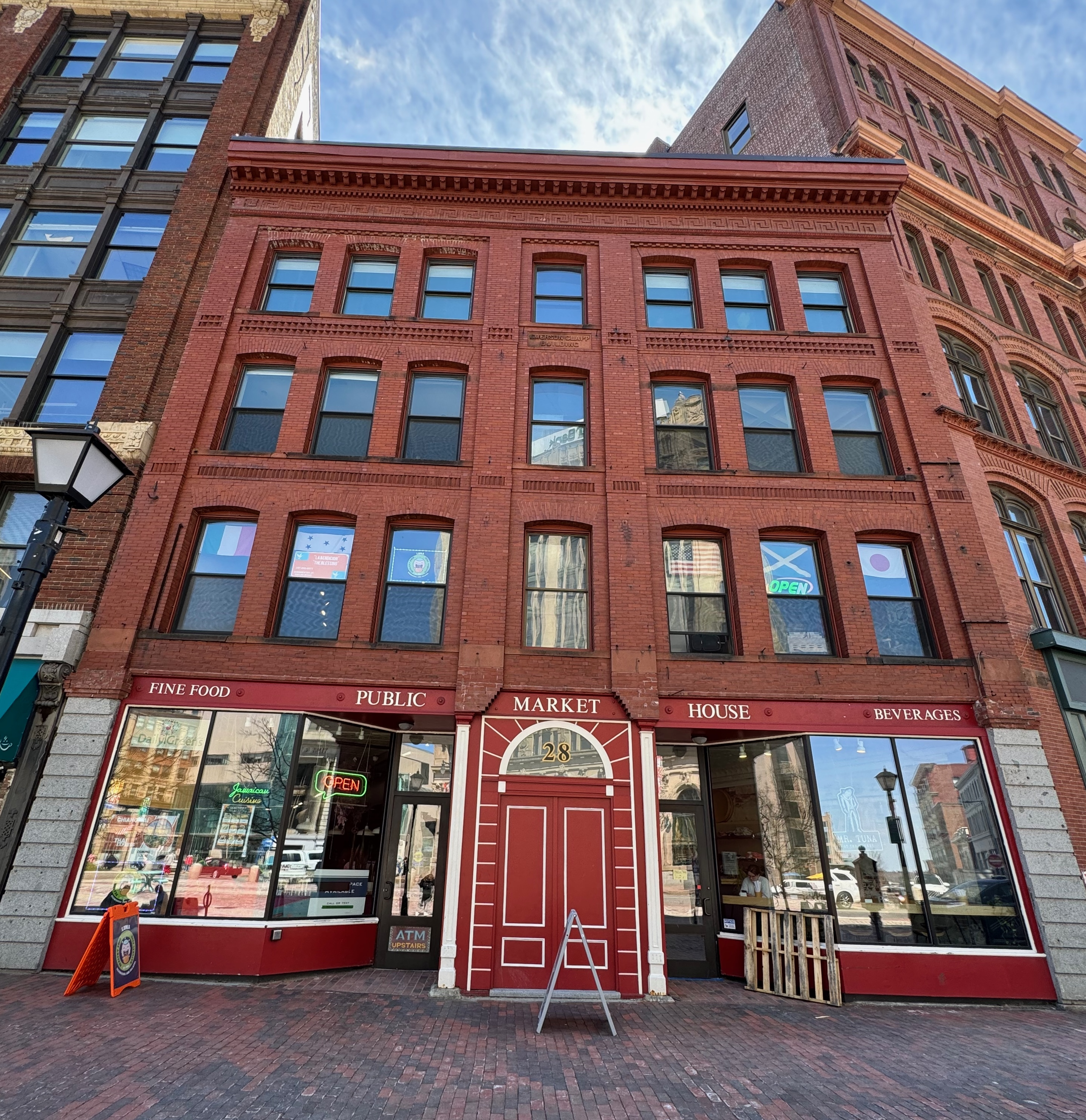
Today's Public Market House, located in the Emerson Clapp Building (built in 1871)
