= Charles Quincy Goodhue =

American artist

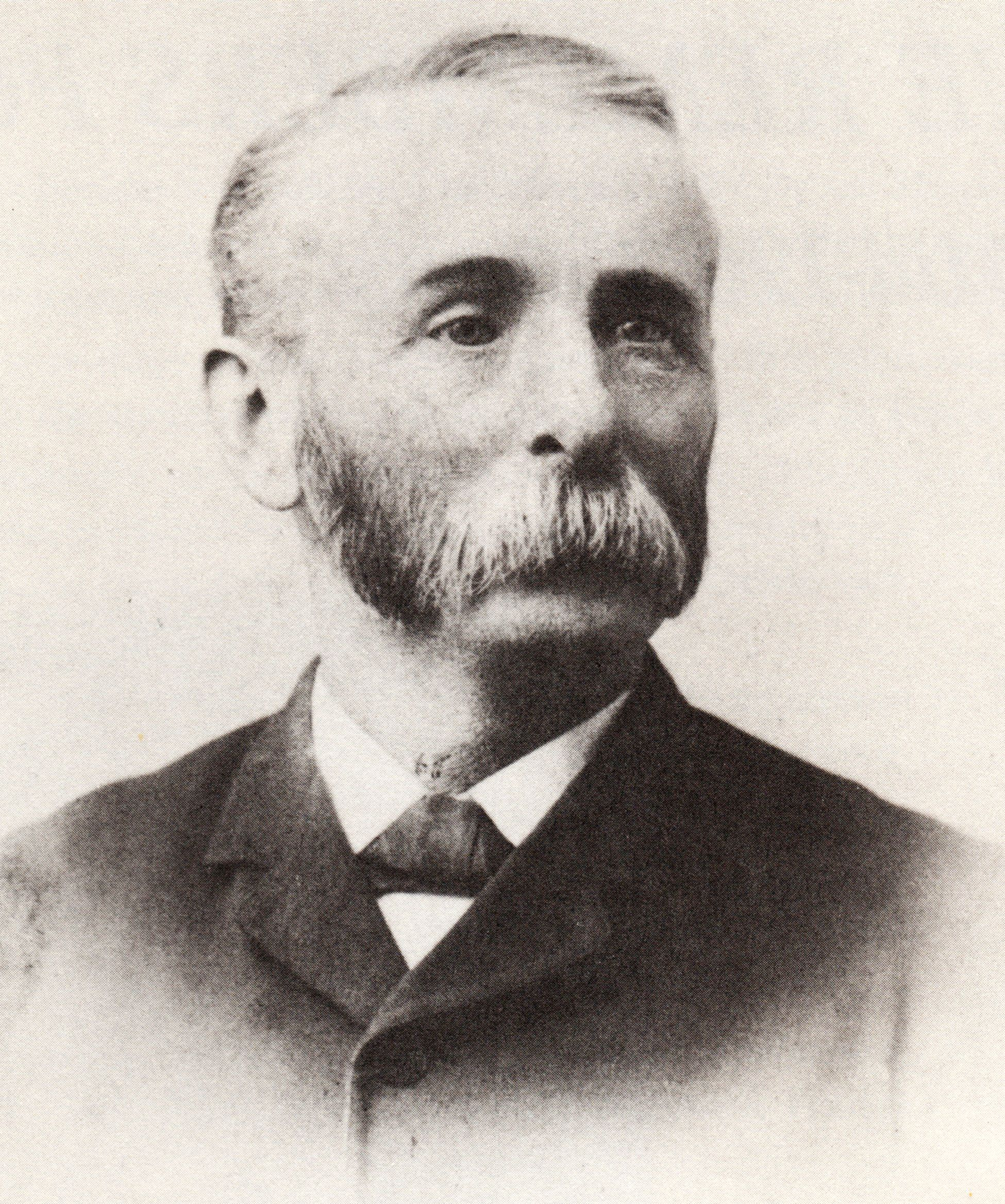
- Goodhue pictured around the turn of the 20th century
- Born: October 2, 1835; Portland, Maine, U.S.
- Died: March 21, 1910 (aged 74); Portland, Maine, U.S.

Charles Quincy Goodhue (October 2, 1835 – March 21, 1910) was an American illustrator. Upon retiring as a marble-cutter in 1890, he began to sketch, from memory, scenes of 19th-century Portland, Maine, his hometown. His book, Portland Through Grandfather's Eyes, is now in the possession of the Maine Historical Society.

== Early life ==
Goodhue was born in Portland, Maine, in 1835, to Richard Shatswell Goodhue and Sarah Wendell Quincy. He was a twin with brother Henry Williams Goodhue.

== Career ==
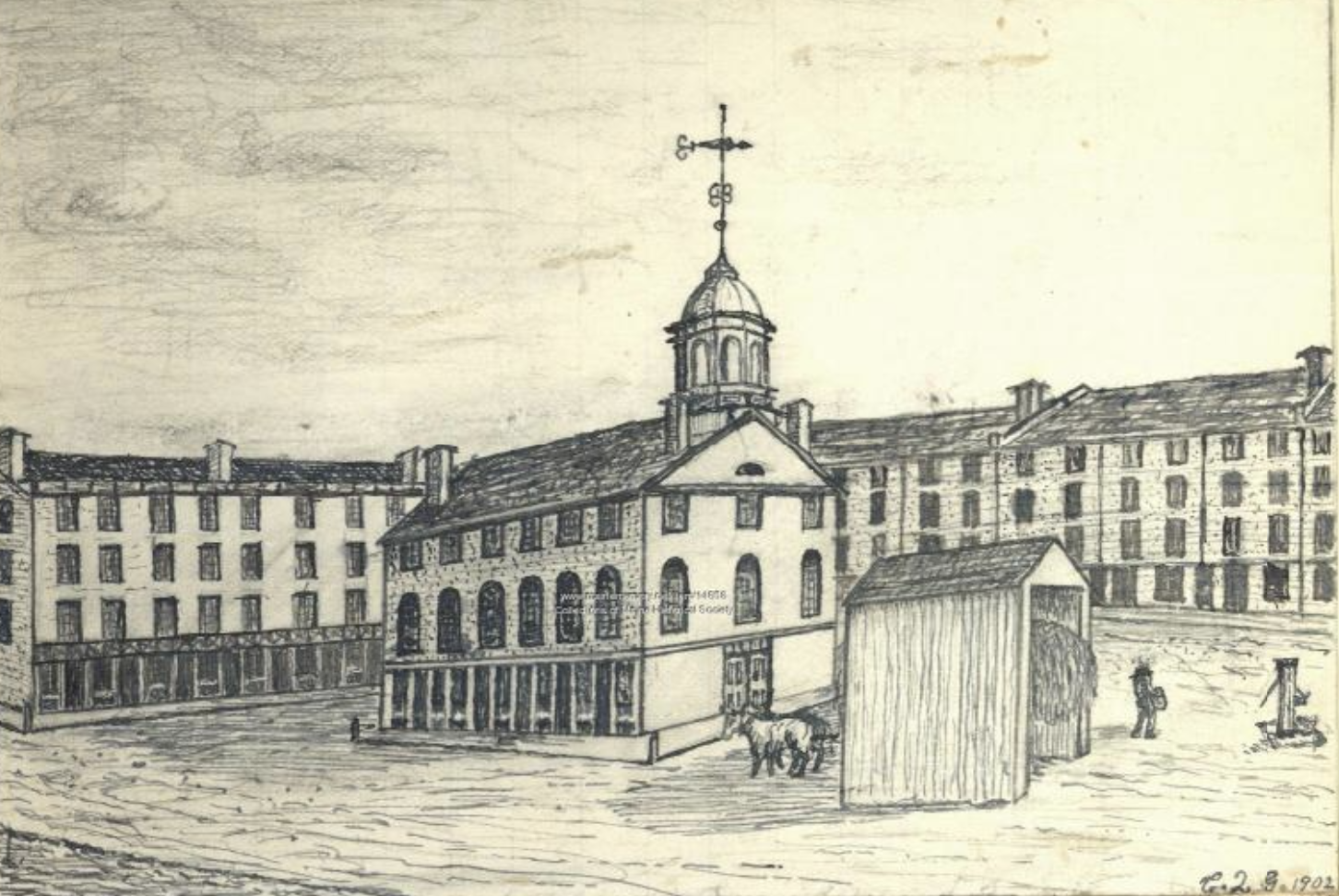
Goodhue's 1902 sketch of Portland's Market House (c. 1830), in today's Monument Square, which was modified in 1833 to become the first city hall

Goodhue found work as a marble-cutter at Enoch M. Thompson's Monument Works company on Portland's Preble Street, at its junction with Cumberland Street. He also worked as a firefighter.

When he retired, in 1890, he began to sketch, from memory or printed materials, several scenes of Portland in the 1840s. He put together a book, Portland Through Grandfather's Eyes, which was recreated in 1981 by the Maine Historical Society as Mr. Goodhue Remembers Portland: Scenes from the Mid-19th Century, containing 23 of Goodhue's drawings and one by his great-granddaughter. Many of the buildings and streetscapes depicted in his sketches were destroyed in the Portland fire of 1866.

== Personal life ==
In 1858, Goodhue married Catherine O'Donnell, with whom he had six known children between 1859 and 1878, including Henrietta Quincy.

== Death ==
Goodhue died in 1910, aged 74. He was interred in Portland's Evergreen Cemetery. His wife was buried beside him upon her death eight years later.
