= Back Cove South Storage Facility =

Coordinates: 43°39′51″N 70°15′54″W

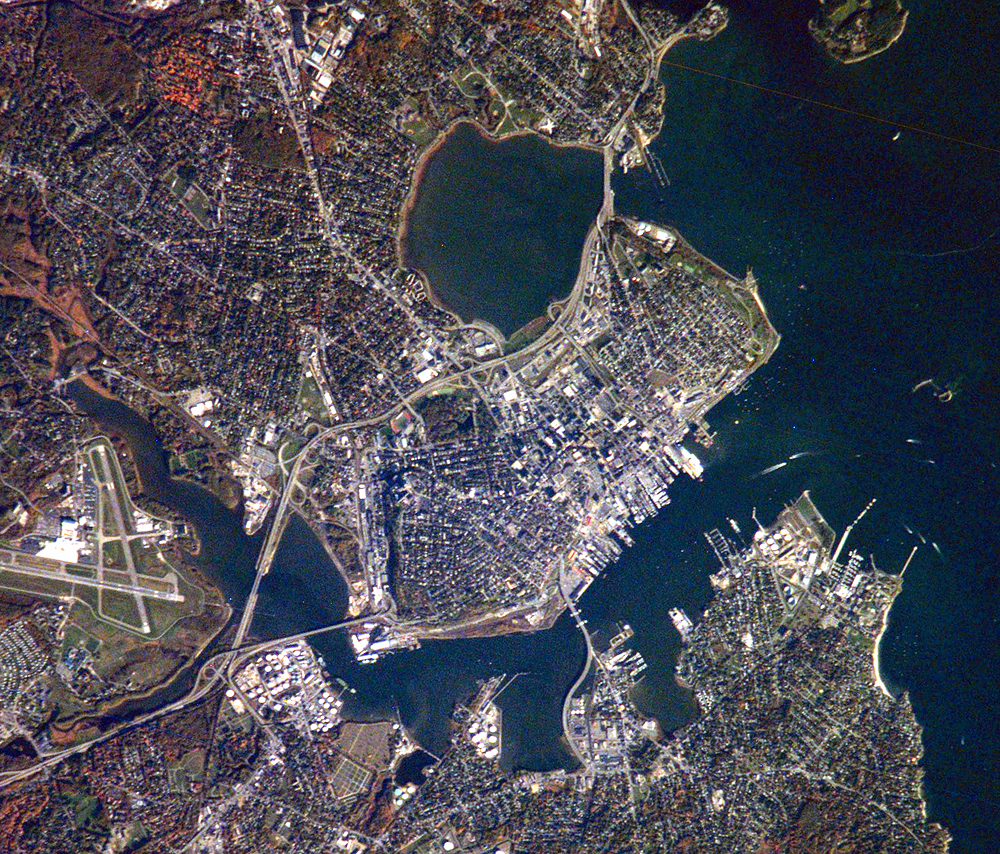
The storage facility will be located beneath the parcel of land at the southern end of Back Cove (the upper central body of water in this image)

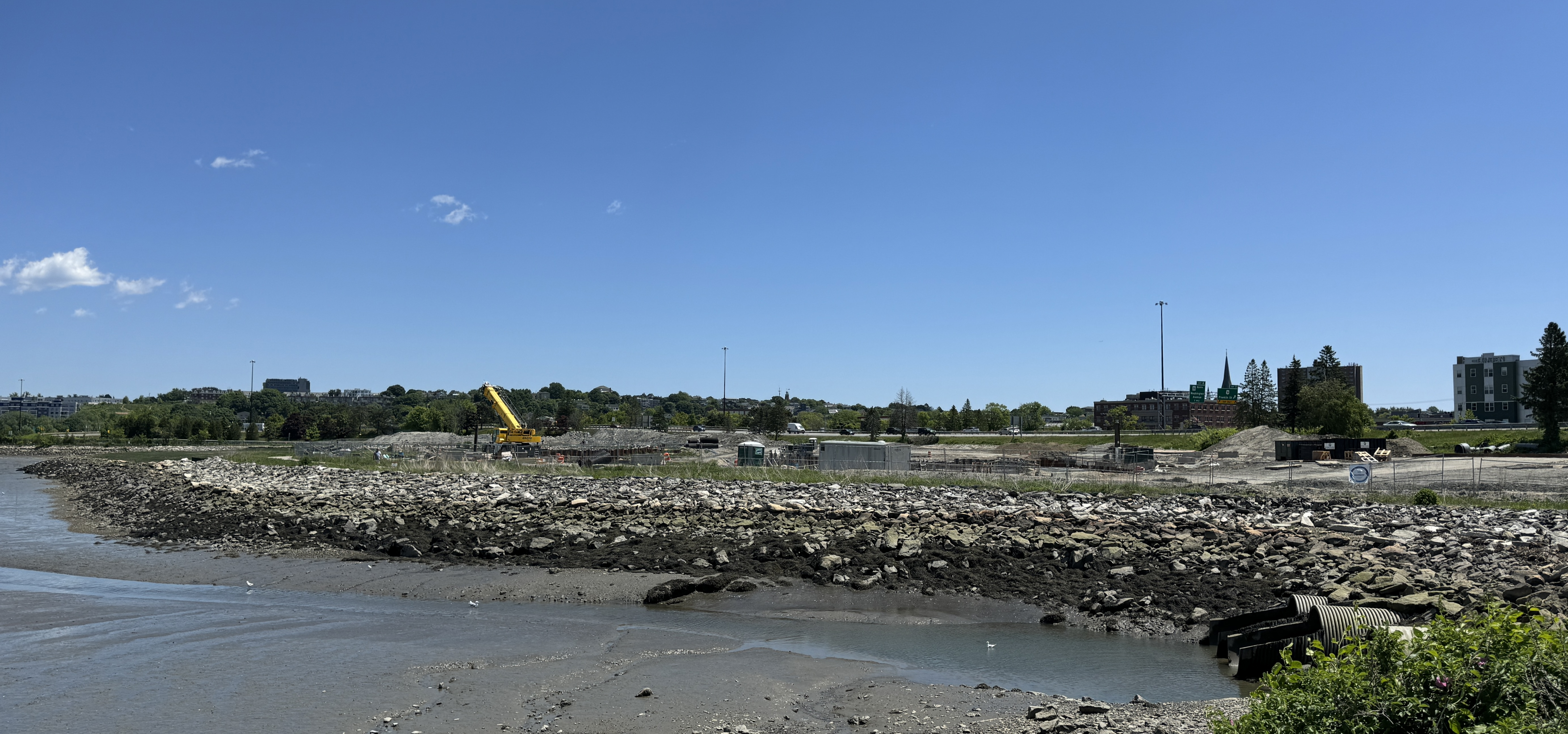
The under-construction project, pictured in June 2024 looking north

The Back Cove South Storage Facility will be the result of a large construction project begun in 2020 in the Back Cove neighborhood of Portland, Maine. Centered on Back Cove Park, between Preble Street to the southwest, Franklin Street to the northeast and Interstate 295 to the southeast, the project—a combined sewer and stormwater overflow (or CSO)—is estimated to cost $40 million, and is the city's largest such project to date. It is designed to reduce combined sewage overflow into both Back Cove and Portland's harbor by 40%. Currently, after heavy rainfall, storm water mixes with sewage and discharges into Casco Bay.

Four concrete tanks, with a total capacity of 3.5 million gallons, will be installed below ground. The soil removed from Back Cove Park will be used to raise the area's elevation, and the soccer fields and access to the Back Cove Trail—which were both demolished as part of the construction—will be restored.

The Back Cove West Storage Conduit, which was installed beside Baxter Boulevard on the western side of Back Cove, was also part of the project, which is being undertaken by Sargent. The final piece of box conduit was installed in October 2022.

The South Storage Facility is Portland's third storage conduit installed at Back Cove. In 2013, the city had built two conduits, each capable of capturing one million gallons of sewer and stormwater to prevent overflow from entering the cove. These were installed in Payson Park and under Baxter Boulevard. A fourth project, to include a 2.25-million-gallon storage conduit is also planned.

The project's completion date was extended by two years to the summer of 2025 due to the discovery of soft clay. It will also cost around $1 million more than originally expected.

== Functionality ==
The underground storage tank will collect the first flow of stormwater—the equivalent of 1 inch (25 mm) of rainfall containing the highest concentration of pollution—during heavy rainfalls and raw sewage from three of the city’s CSOs and store it until it can be pumped to the East End Treatment Plant, located around 0.7 miles (1.1 km) to the northeast, beside Tukey's Bridge. The contaminants will then be removed and treated before the water is discharged into Back Cove.

== Funding ==
The project is being funded through wastewater fees, which are tied to water usage by homeowners and businesses. "None of this is tax base," said senior engineer Bradley Roland. "It's paid for every time someone flushes the toilet."

== See also ==
- 2024 Portland flood
