= William Hawes (miller) =

American miller

- Born: October 23, 1772; Dorchester, Province of Massachusetts
- Died: Unknown
- Occupations: Miller; Member of the Maine House of Representatives
- Spouses: Elizabeth Leeds; Susan Blanchard Russwurm

William Hawes (born October 23, 1772) was an American miller. He was one of the first mill owners in North Yarmouth, Province of Massachusetts, in the part of town that became, in 1849, Yarmouth, Maine, where over fifty mills were in business thereafter. He also represented North Yarmouth in the Maine House of Representatives.

== Early life ==
Hawes was born in Dorchester, Province of Massachusetts, on October 23, 1772, the son of John and Sarah.

== Career ==
In 1816, Hawes founded the first cotton rag paper mill at North Yarmouth's Second Falls, and ran it with father-and-son duo Henry and George Cox. It operated on the falls (eastern) side of the bridge and the northern side of the river from 1816 until 1821.

== Personal life ==
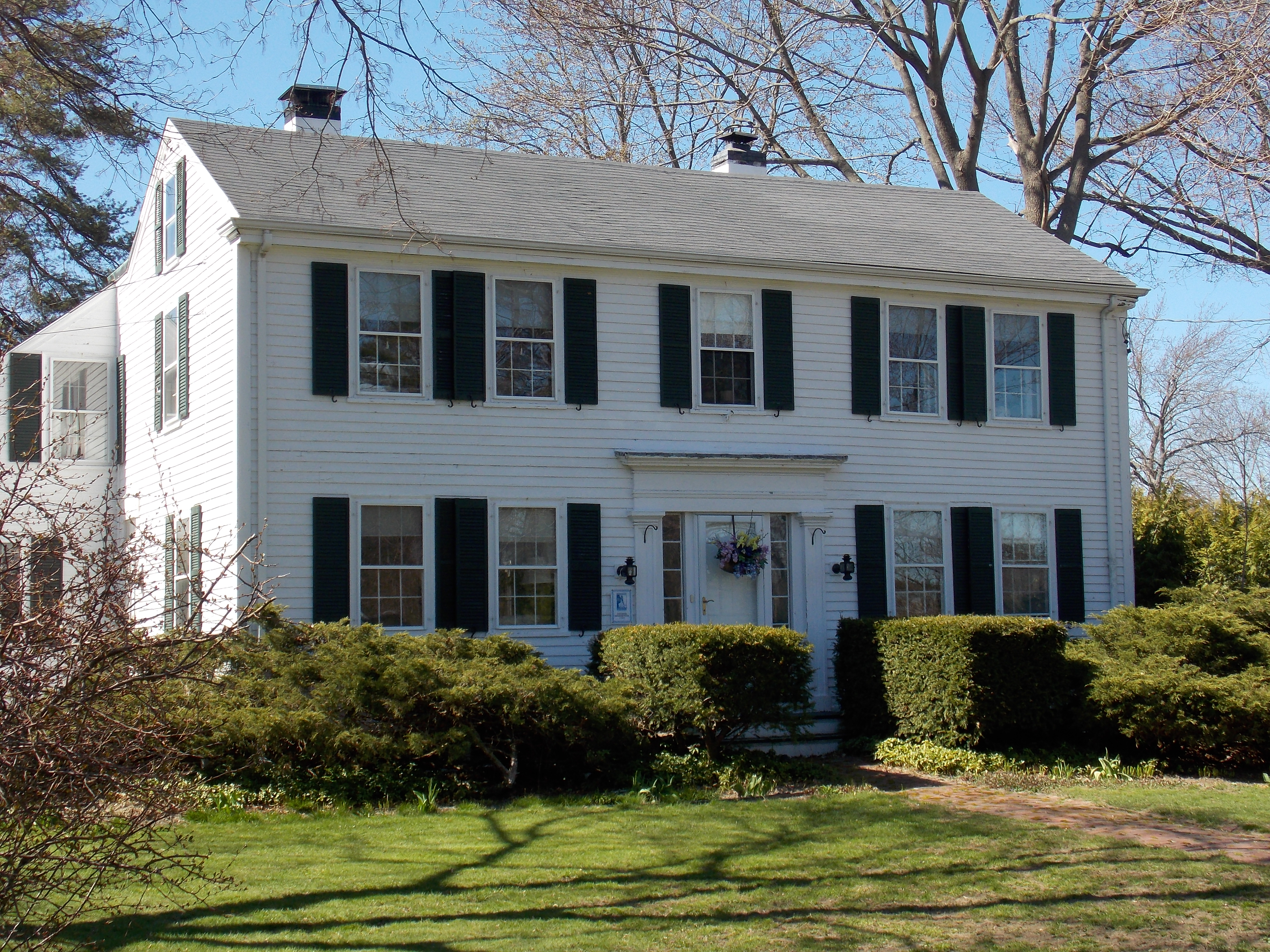
Hawes lived with his second wife, Susan, at this home (now known as the John B. Russwurm House) in Portland's Back Cove

Then a merchant in Boston, Hawes married Elizabeth Leeds (b. July 30, 1775) on July 13, 1806, in Dorchester. They had two children: Gustavus (1807) and Sarah Elizabeth (1809). After the death of his wife, he moved north to Brunswick, Province of Massachusetts, where he was an agent of a factory.

He married for a second time on May 4, 1817, to Susan Blanchard Russwurm, a twice widower. Her first husband, James Humphrey Blanchard, died in Montreal in 1812; her second, John R. Russwurm, died in Back Cove in 1815. With Susan, Hawes had the following children: Marcia Scott (1818), Clarissa (1820), Joseph (1822), Mary Goold (1824), Matilda (1827), William (1832) and Elizabeth Russwurm (1835). Susan already had three children — Ann, Susan and James — from her first marriage, and one — Francis Edward Russwurm (b. 1814) — with her second husband. (To hold property in the West Indies, John Russwurm married "a colored woman", with whom he had John Brown Russwurm in 1799.) At this stage, there were four intertwined bloodlines from the various marriages. He was known to say he "had nine children, and my wife has eleven, and but thirteen all counted."

Hawes moved to the Back Cove farm (now known as the John B. Russwurm House) of his wife and her ex-husband after 1817.

Hawes was listed on the payroll of the Maine House of Representatives, the lower house of the Maine Legislature, in 1835.

In 1850, Hawes owned a house on Yarmouth's Main Street, where today's First Parish Congregational Church was built in 1867. That house was moved a short distance to 23 Storer Street.
