= Neighborhoods in Portland, Maine =

Portland, Maine, is home to many neighborhoods.

== Arts District ==
Portland's Arts District is based around Congress Street in downtown Portland. The District includes the Portland Museum of Art, the Maine College of Art (MECA) and the State Theatre. It is a mixed-use neighborhood with both apartments and commercial establishments.

== Back Cove ==
Back Cove is a neighborhood off of Portland's peninsula and downtown areas. The neighborhood is mostly residential with some commercial business located within Woodford's Corner and along Ocean Avenue. With views of the Portland skyline across Back Cove, the Back Cove neighborhood borders the neighborhoods of Deering Center, North Deering, East Deering, Rosemont, and Oakdale. Neighborhood boundaries are: Washington Avenue (north), Baxter Boulevard (east), Forest Avenue (south), and Canco Road (west).

Within the boundaries of the Back Cove neighborhood are Woodford's Corner, Ocean Avenue, Cheverus High School (a private Jesuit school), and Ocean Avenue School (a Portland Public Schools elementary school). Landscape architect Carl Rust Parker designed the Boulevard Park subdivision of 110 homes in 1912, while Baxter Boulevard was being constructed. The neighborhood includes many historic homes. The John B. Russwurm House and the Sparrow House are located within the Back Cove neighborhood.

The Back Cove Trail is one of the oldest trails in Portland. It is 3.6 miles (5.8 km) long and circles Bay Cove and connects to Payson Park, the Bayside Trail, and the East End Trail. Payson Park is a 48 acres (19 ha) park located within the neighborhood, with baseball and softball fields, basketball courts, tennis courts, a playground, an ice skating rink, a sledding hill, ski and snowboarding park, a playground, a community garden, and the Longfellow Arboretum. The small Barrows Park, Heseltine Park, and the George Street Cemetery are located within the Back Cove neighborhood.

== Bayside ==
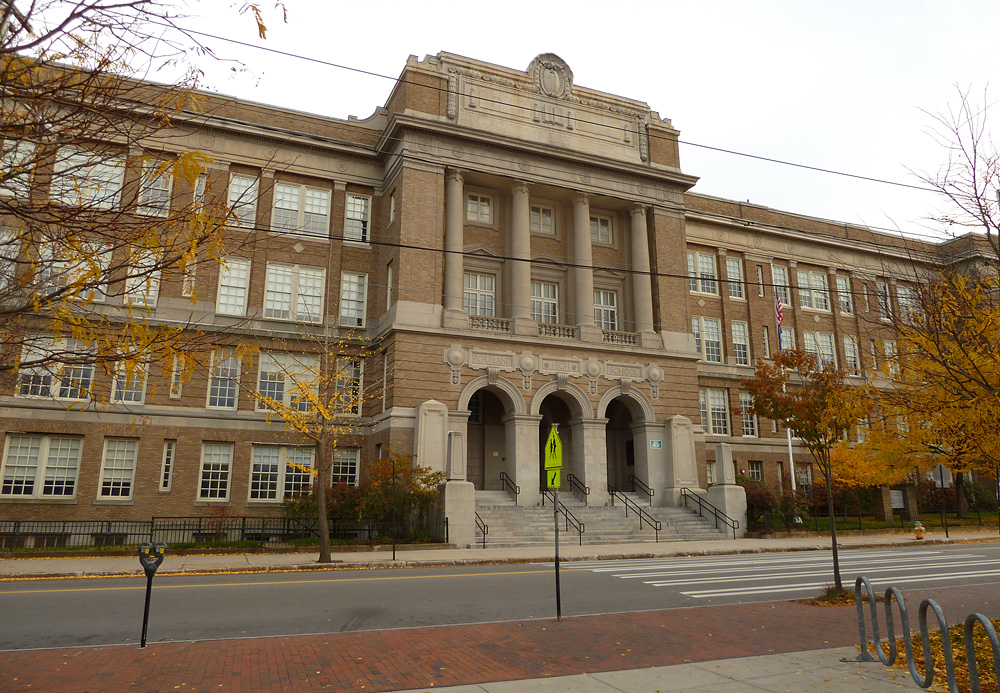
Portland High School, located in Portland's Bayside neighborhood.

Bayside is the downtown neighborhood located between Portland's Old Port and Back Cove. It is a mix of residential and commercial properties and old and modern architecture. The neighborhood is bounded by Forest Avenue, Interstate 295 (I-295), Congress Street, and Franklin Street. It is bordered by the neighborhoods of Parkside, the Old Port, and East Bayside. It is represented by the Bayside Neighborhood Association. It is often confused with the East Bayside neighborhood, which is on the opposite side of Franklin Street.

Portland High School, whose original building that is the school's middle wing was built in 1863, and Baxter Academy, a charter high school with a STEM curriculum, are both located in the neighborhood, as is Merrill Auditorium. The state's only Whole Foods and Trader Joe's supermarkets are located in the Bayside neighborhood, on Somerset Street and Marginal Way, respectively. Notable buildings in the Bayside neighborhood include the Schlotterbeck and Foss Building, an historic Art Deco factory building built in 1927 and that is now apartments, and Franklin Towers, a high-rise apartment building constructed in 1969. Greater Portland Landmarks has documented that Bayside has some of the earliest homes in Portland, including Federal and Greek Revival homes, because most of the neighborhood was not burned in the Great Fire of 1866. The City of Portland's former Public Works operation center in Bayside has been redeveloped to be a commercial center comprising restaurants, breweries, distilleries, exercise studios, a bowling alley, and many new apartment buildings.

The Bayside Bowl bowling alley is located in the Bayside neighborhood next to the former Public Works operation and since 2014 it has been hosting the PBA League Elias Cup team competition. The PBA League said Bayside Bowl has rejuvenated its event.

The Bayside Trail begins on Elm Street in the Bayside neighborhood. The trail goes across the Franklin Street divided throughway, through East Bayside, and connects to the East End Trail and the Back Cove Trail. The Stone Street Playground is located in the neighborhood and is popular in the summertime because of the splash pad fountain and the proximity to the Old Port. The neighborhood association rents plots in the community garden located on Chestnut Street across from the Daymark condominium building that was built in 2022.

== Deering Center ==
Deering Center is a neighborhood that runs from Brighton Avenue to Forest Avenue to Walton Street, then past Evergreen Cemetery, near Wayside Street on Ludlow Street. Formerly known as the town of Deering (named for Captain James Deering, horse farmer and early resident of Deering), which separated from Westbrook in 1871. It was incorporated into Portland as Deering Center on March 9, 1899.

== Deering Highlands ==
Deering Highlands is a residential neighborhood on a hill generally bordered by Woodford Street to the north, Stevens Avenue to the west, Deering Street to the east, and the sloping hillside of streets in the same area, south of Brighton Avenue. The map on Barry & Anderson's Deering: A Social and Architectural History, p. 15, is ambiguous as to the neighborhood's precise borders.

Deering Highlands was developed in the late 19th century, and maintains much of its original historical character, including numerous examples of architecture by John Calvin Stevens, Frederick A Tompson, and other regional architects. Among Highlands' most notable historical residents was controversial U.S. senator Ralph Owen Brewster, who owned the house at 79 Highland Street.

The neighborhood is almost entirely residential, but the largest institutional feature of the Highlands is Maine Medical Center's Brighton Avenue Campus (formerly known as the Brighton Medical Center). The complex is now home of the New England Rehabilitation Hospital of Portland and also houses training facilities and an urgent care center.

== East Bayside ==
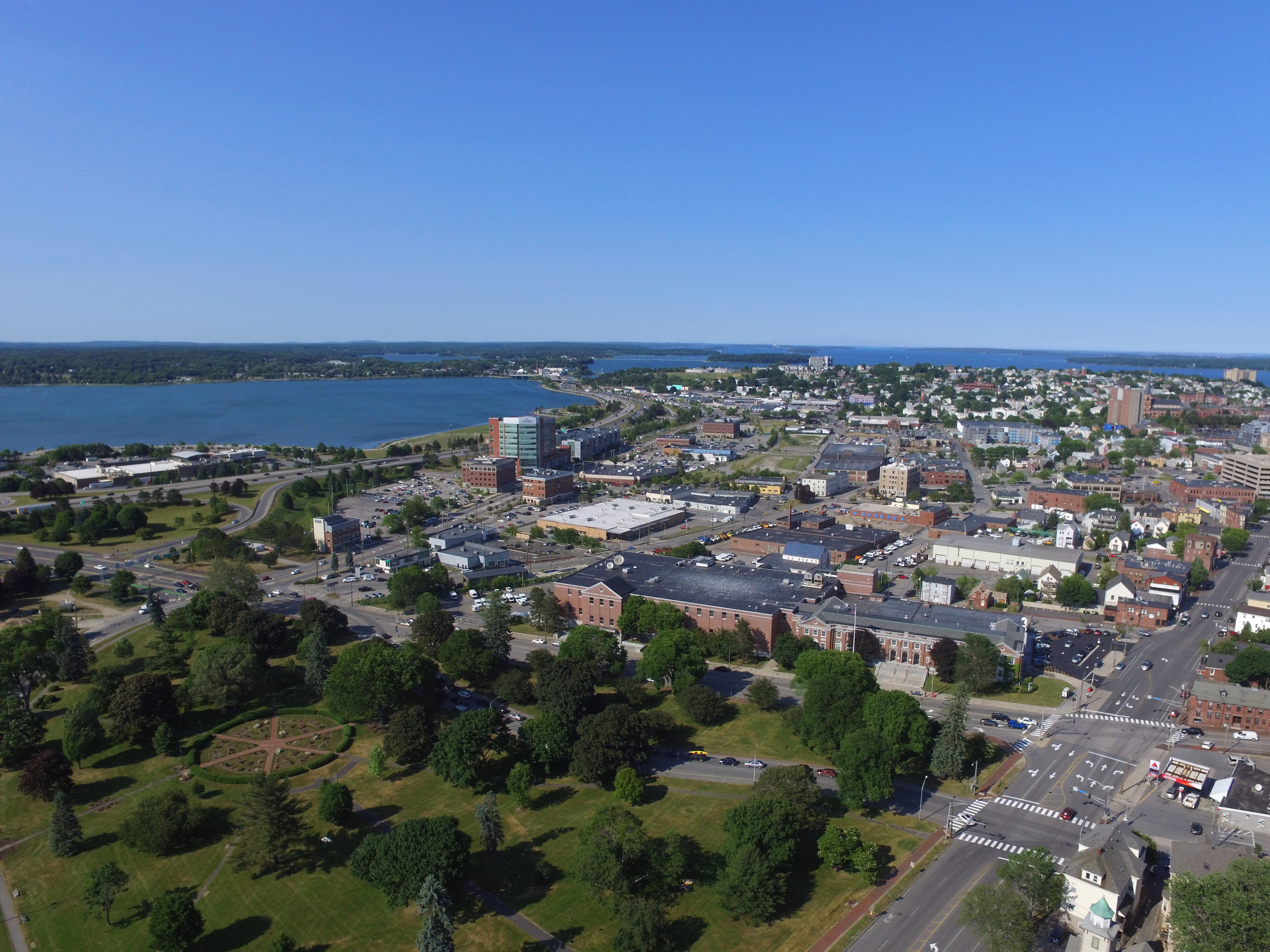
A view over part of Deering Oaks in Parkside with Bayside, then East Bayside, then the East End, then Munjoy Hill beyond and with Back Cove to the left.

East Bayside is bordered by Franklin Street on the west, Washington Avenue on the east, to the north by Marginal Way, and the south by Congress Street. It is bordered by the neighborhoods of Bayside, the Old Port and Munjoy Hill. It was first developed a street network in the early 19th century. By the 1820s, the area was Portland's second seaport via the Back Cove's ship channel. Much of the debris from the Portland fire of 1866 was deposited into Back Cove, significantly increasing the size of East Bayside. Maps produced around 1900 show an extension of the shoreline out to Marginal Way. The shoreline did not change again until the construction of the interstate in 1974. East Bayside is often confused with Bayside, which is the neighborhood on the opposite side of Franklin Street. East Bayside is represented by the East Bayside Neighborhood Organization.

== East Deering ==
East Deering is the city's easternmost neighborhood, which includes waterfront homes, residential neighborhoods, Payson Park and the future home of the Roux Institute. The area was annexed by Portland alongside other Deering neighborhoods. The first Europeans to settle in the area were farmers. Now a suburban and residential neighborhood, it is situated between Munjoy Hill and North Deering, as well as the town of Falmouth. East Deering has a mix of housing including public housing, privately owned apartments, small single-family homes, and larger, more expensive single-family homes.

Businesses are located on Washington Avenue and Veranda Street, where there are restaurants, an ice cream shop, and a juice bar. Much of the neighborhood has views of Casco Bay and nearby Mackworth Island. Major landmarks in this neighborhood include Tukey's Bridge, the B&M Baked Beans factory, Martin's Point, Presumpscot School, Grand Trunk Cemetery, Payson Park, and Lunts Corner. In 2021, the Roux Institute purchased the B&M factory in order to convert it into a campus with academic buildings, student housing, a hotel, and public waterfront access.

East Deering was bisected by I-295 in the 1960s. The major throughways in East Deering are Washington Avenue and Veranda Street. Martin's Point Bridge connects East Deering to Falmouth.

== East End ==
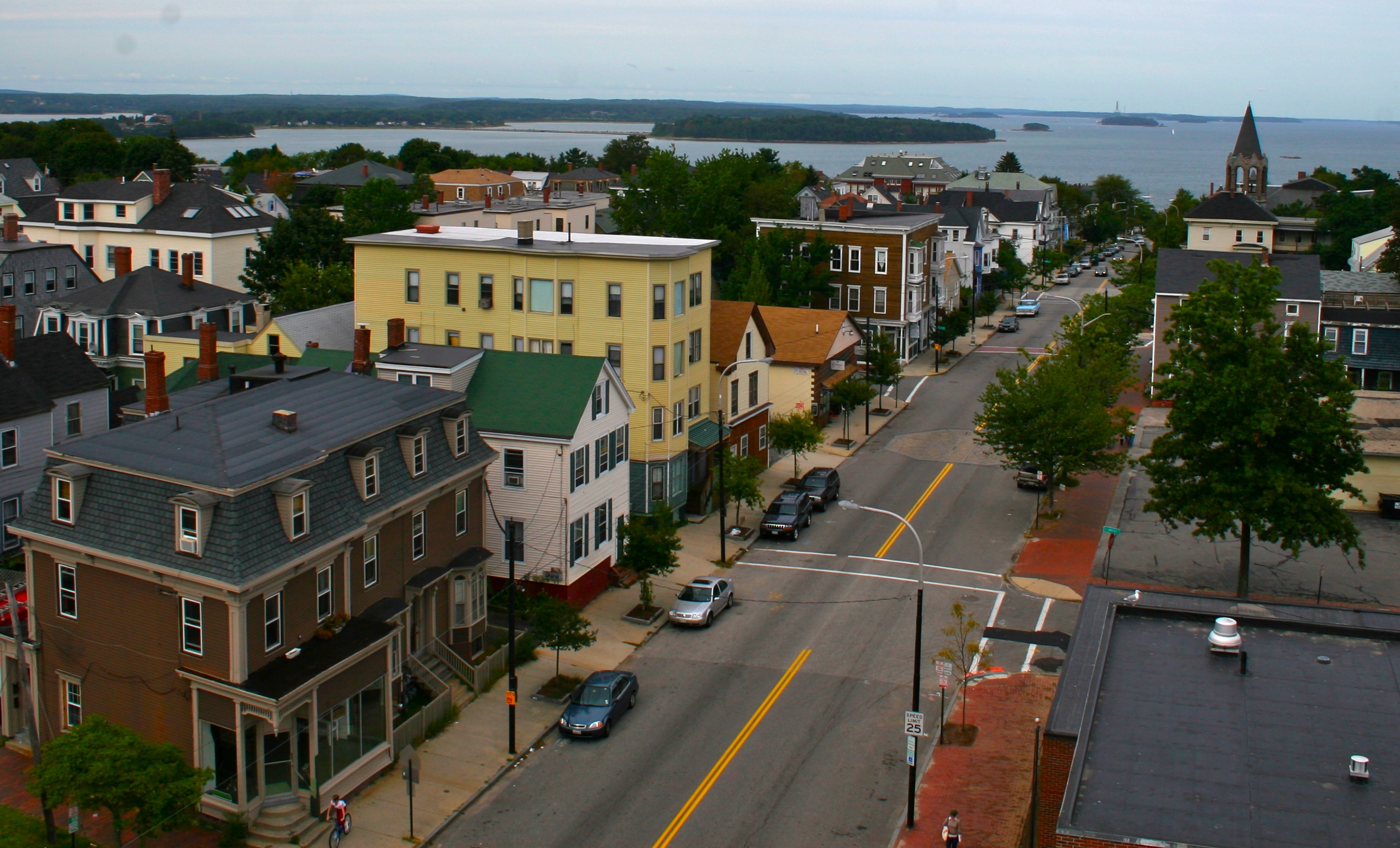
Munjoy Hill.

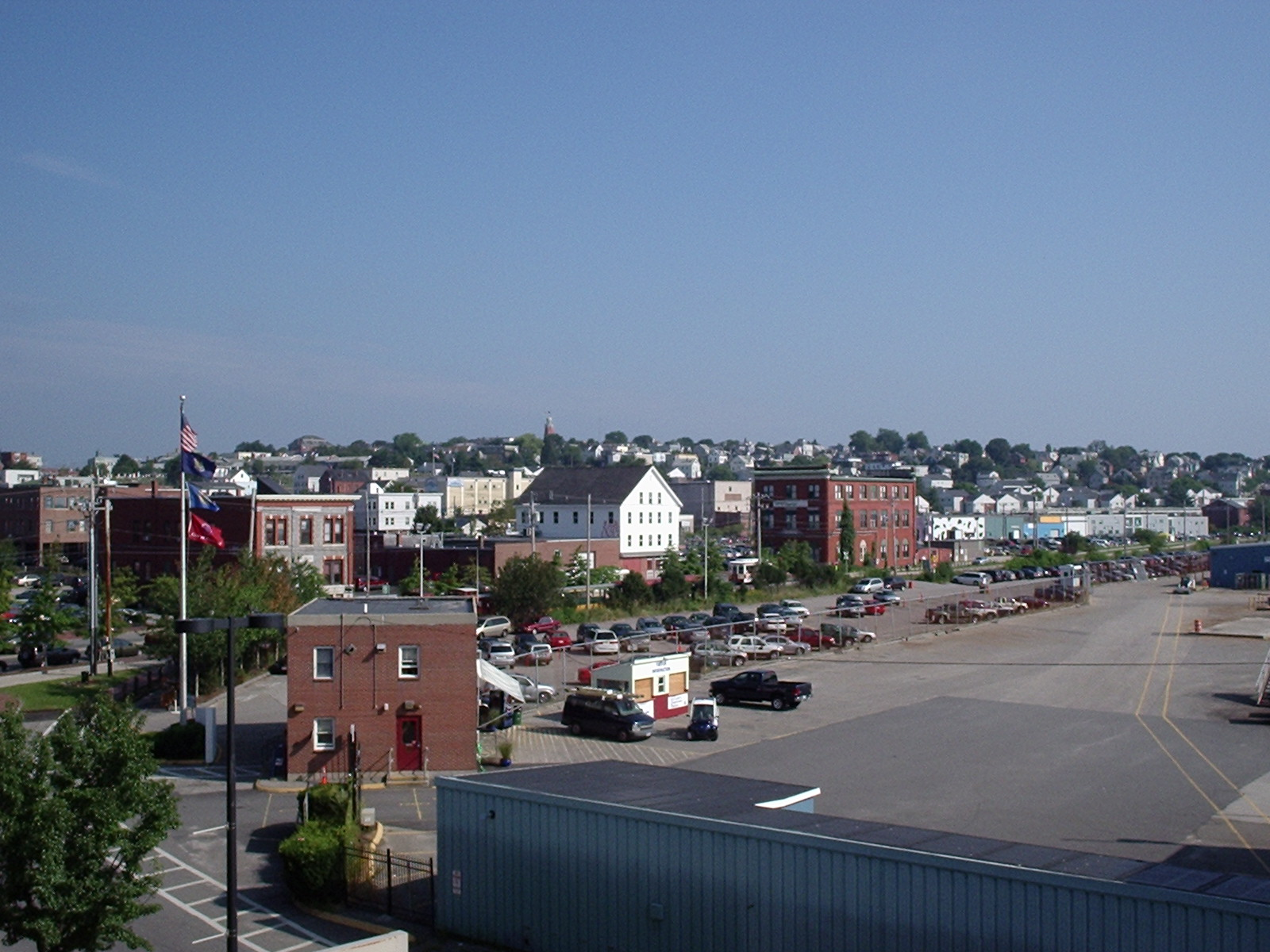
The East End.

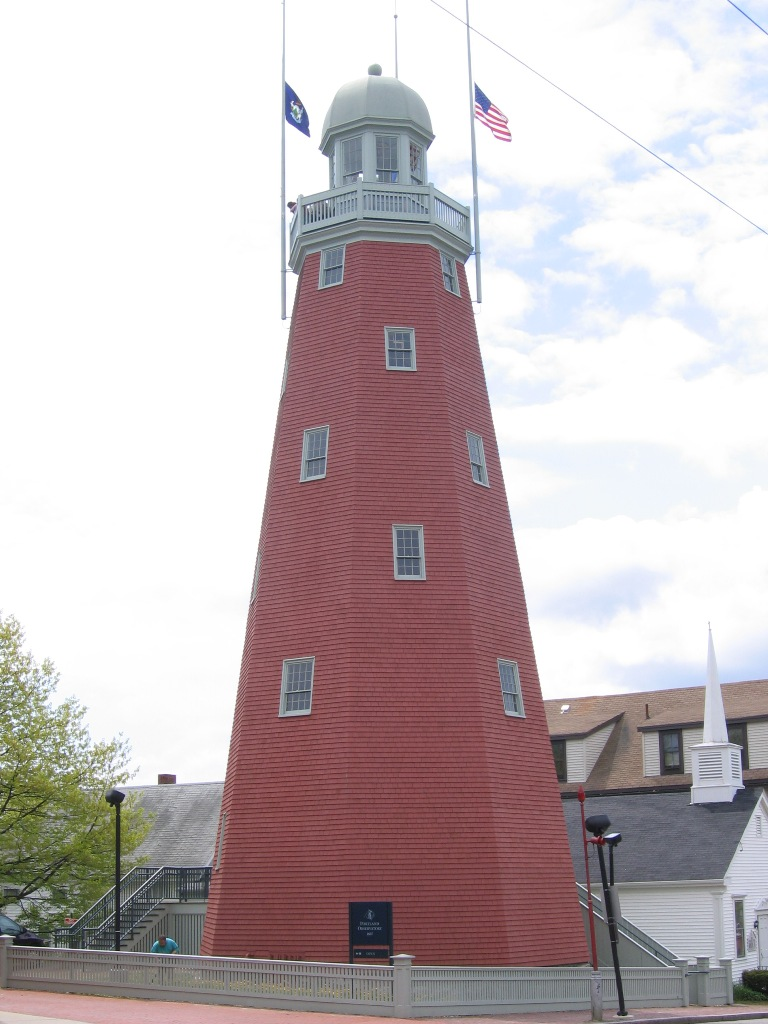
The Portland Observatory, built in 1807, sits atop Munjoy Hill

The East End is a neighborhood on the far eastern end of Portland's peninsula. It is closely linked with Munjoy Hill and the Eastern Promenade. The East End Community School, located on North Street, serves the area. The East End Beach is also located there. Notable buildings include the Portland Observatory at the top of Munjoy Hill.

== Libbytown ==
Libbytown is a neighborhood in southern and western Portland, wedged between the Stroudwater, Rosemont, Oakdale, and Parkside neighborhoods, and separated from the city of South Portland by the Fore River. Maine's busiest public transit hub, the Portland Transportation Center, is in Libbytown.

== Nasons Corner ==
The area around outer Brighton Avenue is Nasons Corner. While part of the independent town of Deering in the 1890s, the area was primarily agricultural, with acres of strawberries and fields of hay. Capisic Brook runs through part of the neighborhood, and its banks were home to the Lucas and Hamblet family-run brickyards, which were sold throughout New England. In 1898, Nasons Corner and the rest of Deering was annexed by the City of Portland. The earliest housing developments in the neighborhood were built beginning around that time and were called Brighton Avenue Terrace and Portland Garden (now Holm Street and Taft Street). The Glenwood project was underway by 1900. It included affordable bungalow style homes named for English counties (Devon, Dorset, Essex, Kent, and Warwick). The Glenwood Baptist Church was built by the 1950s. The park will be part of a greening effort to restore its intended use as a "Learning Environment" by building new natural play scapes. A partnership between the City of Portland, the Nason's Corner Neighborhood Association, Breakwater School and Portland Trails. They broke ground on October 29, 2013, and should be completed by the fall of 2014.

=== Sagamore Village ===
During World War II, many rural Mainers moved to Portland due to labor shortages in the booming defense industry based around Portland harbor. In 1943, Sagamore Village was built to ease the housing shortage. It was owned and operated by the federal government until 1953. It was a multiracial and multiethnic community, which was unique for many of the residents. Following the end of the war, the federal government sought to sell housing developments like Sagamore and Redbank in neighboring South Portland. Initially, the city council rebuffed calls to purchase the housing development but in 1950, it reversed its position due to public pressure and purchased the housing complex. It was opened for low-income individuals.

== North Deering ==
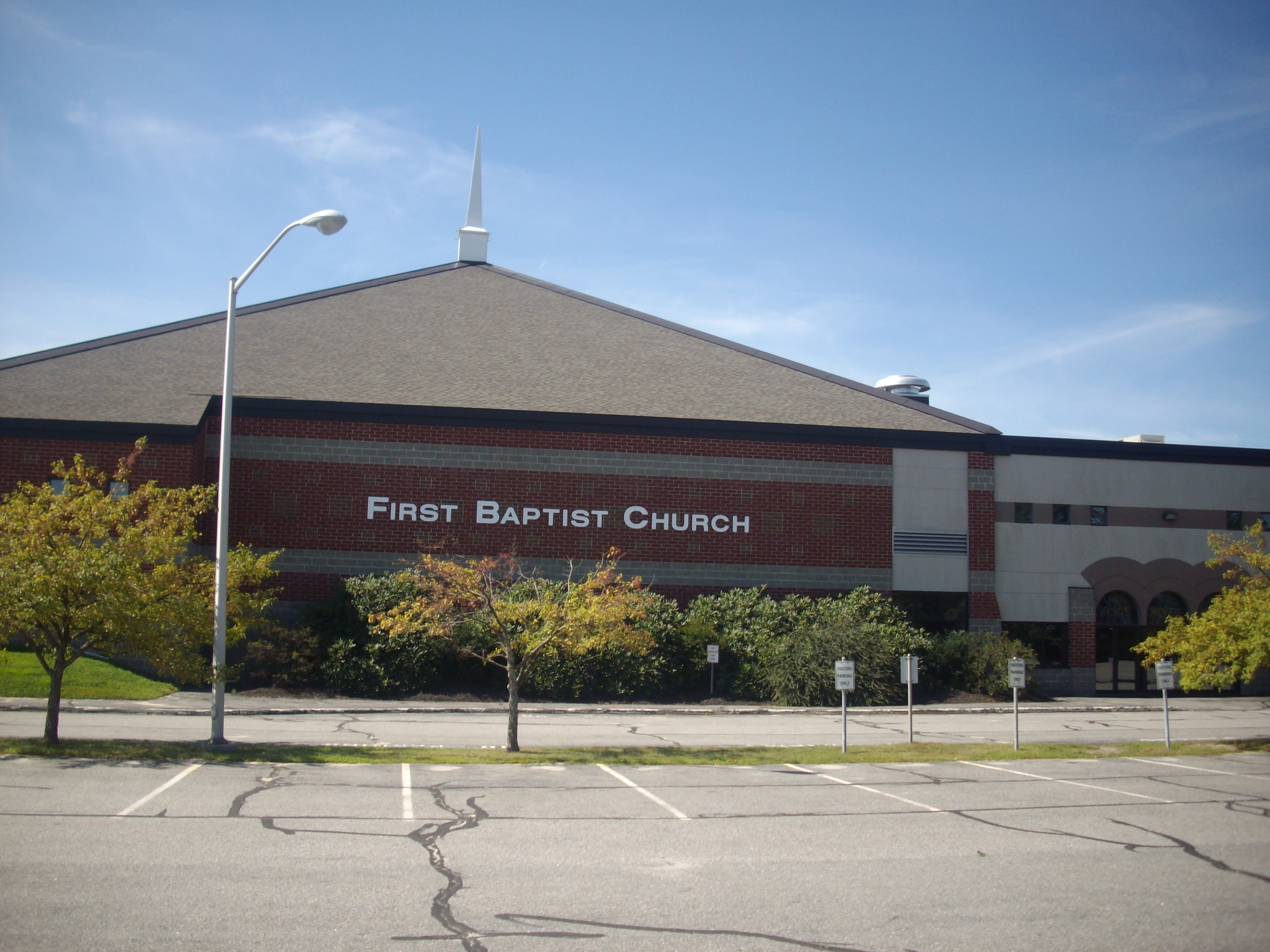
The First Baptist Church in North Deering.

North Deering is the northernmost neighborhood of the city. It is situated between the Riverton and East Deering neighborhoods of the city, as well as bordering the town of Falmouth. It is home to some of the oldest surviving houses in the city, because the neighborhood was spared all of the four fires that plagued much of the rest of the city in the past. In North Deering's early history, it had an agriculture- and lumber-based economy, but with the spread of the automobile, North Deering became more economically connected to the rest of the city. Today, it a bustling suburban neighborhood with some long-standing retail activity. It is home to WGME, Portland's local CBS affiliate. The Presumpscot River Preserve, a 48-acre (19 ha) nature preserve, is located in North Deering. It was purchased and preserved in 2001 by the Land for Maine Future program as well as the City Land Bank Commission and Portland Trails.

It is served by Harrison Lyseth Elementary School and Lyman Moore Middle School (which also serves the East Deering and Munjoy Hill neighborhoods). Prospective North Deering High School students can also choose between attending Portland High School, Deering High School, or Casco Bay High School, all three of which serve the entire city.

== Oakdale ==
Oakdale is a primarily residential university neighborhood. It consists mostly of owner-occupied homes, a few businesses, and the Portland campus of the University of Southern Maine. All the neighborhood is within walking distance of the university. The neighborhood is bounded by Ashmont Street, Devonshire Street, St. John Street, I-295, and Baxter Boulevard. Oakdale's residents are part of the Woodfords-Oakdale Neighborhood Association.

The neighborhood includes the Southworth Planetarium, the Sullivan Athletic Complex, and the Glickman Library. Parks in the neighborhood include Baxter Boulevard, Longfellow Park, Noyes Park, and Fessenden Park. The Deering Avenue bridge connects the neighborhood to the neighboring Deering Oaks and the city's athletic complex of Fitzpatrick Stadium, Hadlock Field, Portland Expo, and Troubh Ice Arena. Commercial businesses are mainly located along Forest Avenue.

The historic Nathan Clifford School, built in 1907, was the neighborhood school until it was closed in 2011 and replaced by the Ocean Avenue Elementary School. In 2013, the city sold the Nathan Clifford School for $1 to the Developers Collaborative. It was supposed to primarily include "high-density affordable housing", but instead the developers "remodeled the building to create 22 market-rate apartments." On January 27, 2014, the former schoolhouse was listed on the National Register of Historic Places.

== Old Port ==
The Old Port (sometimes known as the Old Port Exchange) is a neighborhood known for its cobblestone streets, 19th-century brick buildings and fishing piers. The district is filled with boutiques, restaurants and bars. Because of its reputation for nightlife, the Old Port is a popular destination for tourists and locals alike. It is bordered by the neighborhoods of Bayside, East Bayside, Munjoy Hill and the West End.

== Parkside ==
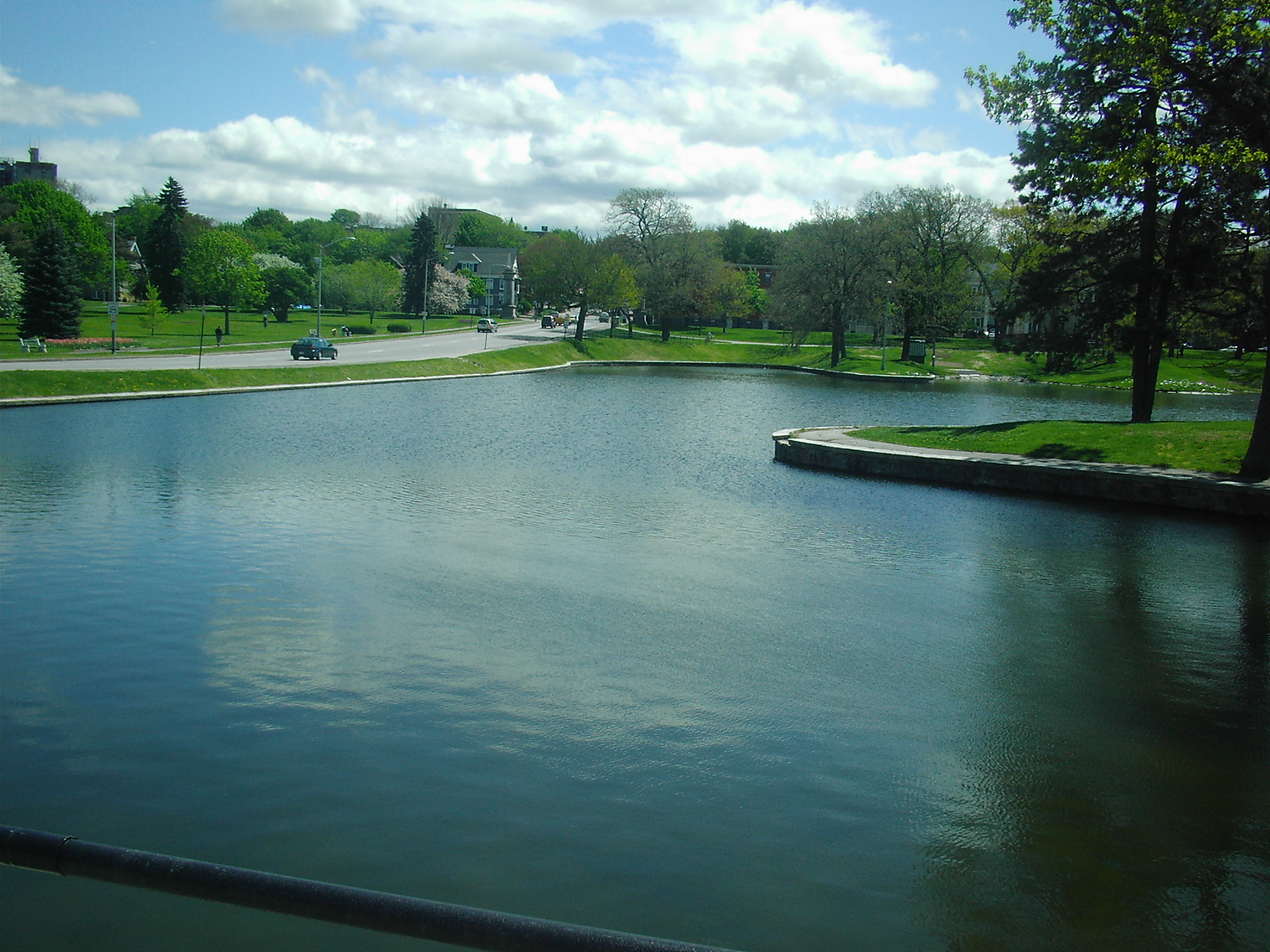
Deering Oaks pond overlooking Parkside.

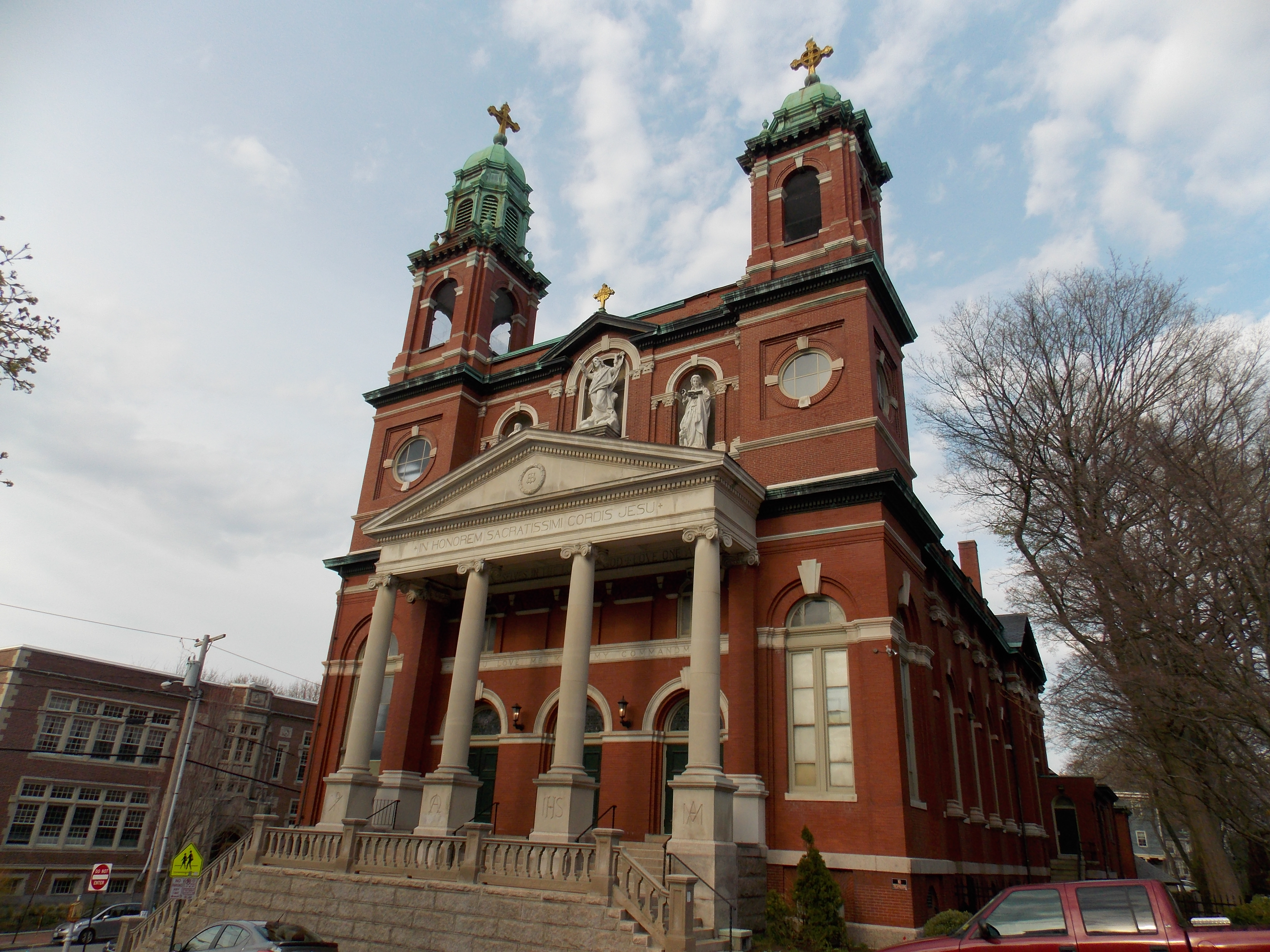
Parkside's Sacred Heart Church was constructed between 1896 and 1915. It sits on the corner of Mellen and Grant Streets. Besides religious services, it serves as a hub for social services and aid in the neighborhood.

Parkside neighborhood, located at the base of the Portland peninsula, is bordered by I-295 on the far side of Deering Oaks, Forest Avenue on the East, Congress Street on the south, and Weymouth Street on the west. Parkside borders the neighborhoods of West End. Bayside and Libbytown. Herbert Adams, a local historian, resides in and represented the district in the Maine House of Representatives. The neighborhood began following the 1866 fire, when most of Portland's waterfront and downtown were burned. Residents moved south across the peninsula and laid out Sherman Avenue and Grant Avenue (now streets), named after Civil War generals William Tecumseh Sherman and future President Ulysses S. Grant. The homes in the neighborhood are primarily triple-decker buildings and soon after its founding became home to much of Portland's Italian and Irish immigrant populations. The neighborhood was previously known for rampant drug use and prostitution.

== Peaks Island ==
Peaks Island is the most populous island in Casco Bay, and is part of the city of Portland. It is approximately 3 miles (4.8 km) from downtown. The island is served by Casco Bay Lines and has its own elementary school, library, and police station. It is the only island in Casco Bay that allows cars, due to its size.

== Riverton ==
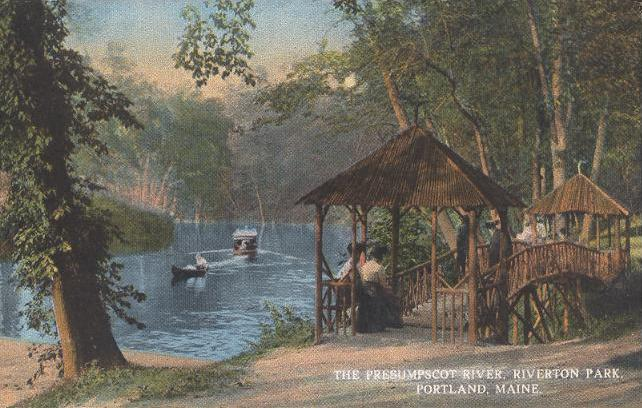
Riverton Park circa 1910.

Riverton neighborhood is located in northwestern Portland. The Riverton Trolley Park, established in 1896, was located in the neighborhood. The park closed in 1929. At the time, it was a premier leisure destination. A trolley brought people from Monument Square to the area. A branch of the Portland Public Library is located there as well. Riverton Elementary School serves as the neighborhood school. The University of New England (UNE) merged with Westbrook College in 1996, with Westbrook College's campus in Riverton becoming UNE's Portland Campus. It is home of the Westbrook College Historic District.

== Rosemont ==
Rosemont is a neighborhood located close to Deering Center and other off-peninsula neighborhoods. Longfellow Elementary School, Lincoln Middle School and Deering High School are located here. The local branch library, Burbank Library, is one of the highest circulating libraries in Maine. Capisic Pond, an important recreational site, is located here.

== Saint John Valley ==
The Saint John Valley Neighborhood is located between the West End and Libbytown neighborhoods, bordered by the Parkside Neighborhood and the Fore River.

- Northern Boundary: Interstate 295
- Eastern Boundary: The Western Promenade, including the Maine Medical Center Campus; Congress Street, and Weymouth Street continuing along the north side of Hadlock Field to I-295
- Western Boundary: Along the Fore River from Veterans Bridge to I-295
- Southern Boundary: The intersection of Valley Street, Veterans Bridge, and Commercial Street

The Saint John Valley Neighborhood Association was created in 2008 in an effort to define an area of the city that lacked funding and recognition. Since its inception, many improvements have been made and more are planned, such as traffic calming, beautification, and over-all streetscaping to create a more pedestrian-friendly environment. The area north of I-295 and south of St. John Street is claimed by both The Saint John Valley and Libbytown Neighborhood Associations.

== Stroudwater ==
Stroudwater is located in the southwest corner of Portland, bordered by the Nasons Corner and Libbytown neighborhoods to the north and east, the city of Westbrook to the west, and the city of South Portland to the south. Maine's busiest airport, the Portland International Jetport, originally known as Stroudwater Field, is located here. Stroudwater is home to a number of historic structures, including the oldest standing publicly accessible building in Portland, the Tate House and Museum, which was built in 1755. The James Forder house, built in Stroudwater in 1730 at 1235 Westbrook Street, is recognized as the oldest house in Portland. The Stroudwater Historic District is also located here. It is home to the mouth of the Stroudwater River.

Stroudwater was founded as a hamlet which, with power generated by the Stroudwater River and Fore Rivers, was an important producer of masts for the Royal Navy. In the 2000s, Stroudwater was considered a quiet suburb of downtown Portland, though it is still officially within the city boundaries.

== West End ==
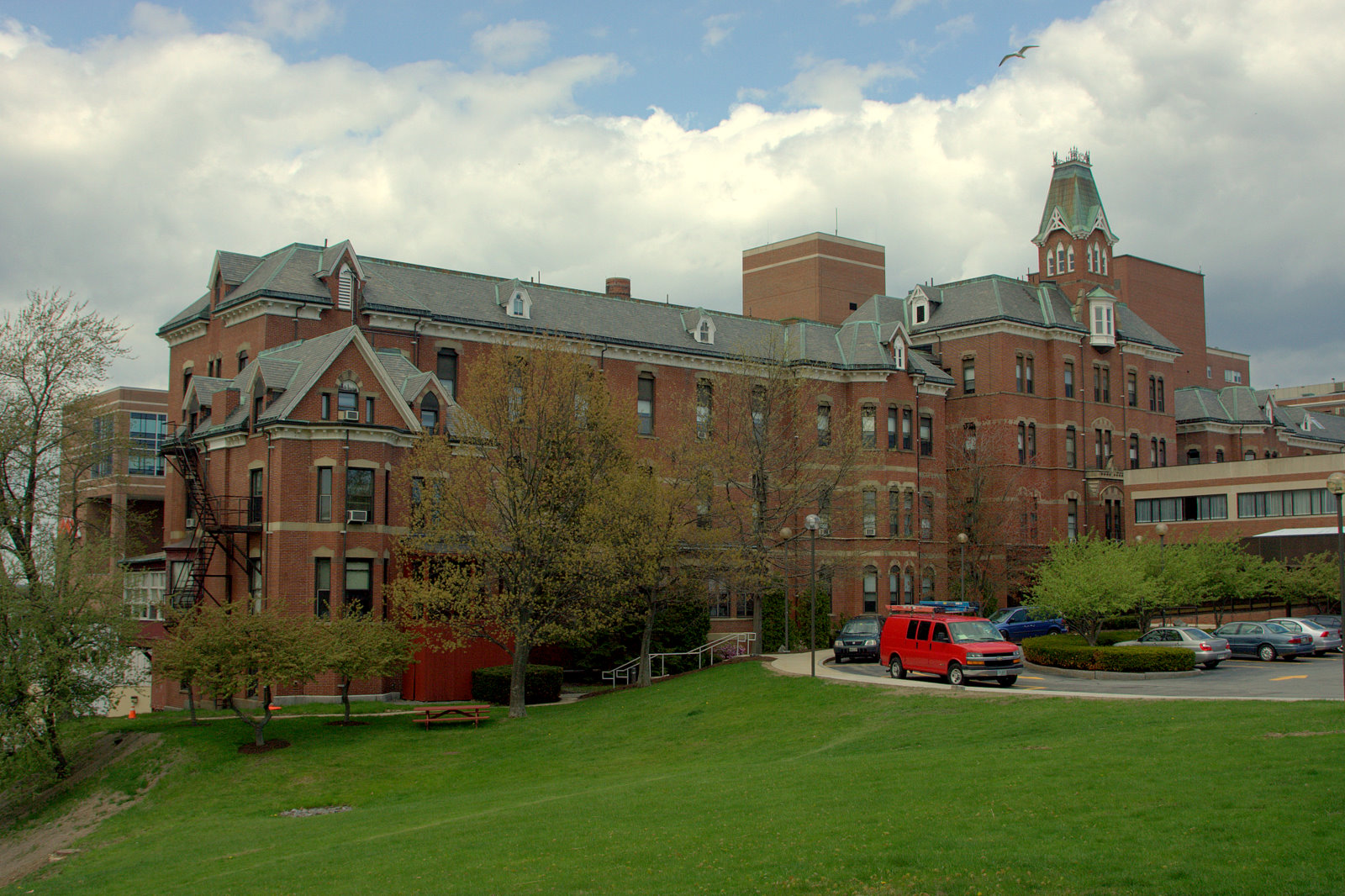
Maine Medical Center is a major institution located in the West End.

The West End neighborhood is located on the western side of Portland's peninsula. It includes a number of historical and well-preserved architecture.

Noted for its architecture, the West End is home to a number of historical homes and the Western Promenade Historic District. In 2010, it was called "one of the best preserved Victorian neighborhoods in the country". The Western Promenade features prominently in the neighborhood. Other historical buildings include The Gothic House, Harrison B. Brown House, A.B. Butler House, Joseph Holt Ingraham House, Morrill Mansion, William Minott House and Waynflete School. The Western Cemetery, Portland's primary cemetery from 1829 to 1852, is located in the neighborhood as well. Maine Medical Center, Maine's largest hospital and Portland's largest employer, is also located in the West End. Queen Anne's Hospital was established in the West End in 1918. Renamed Mercy Hospital, it is now the fourth-largest hospital in Maine.
