= Washington Avenue (Portland, Maine) =

Street in Portland, Maine

Coordinates: 43.70090°N 70.28919°W

- Main Street (formerly)
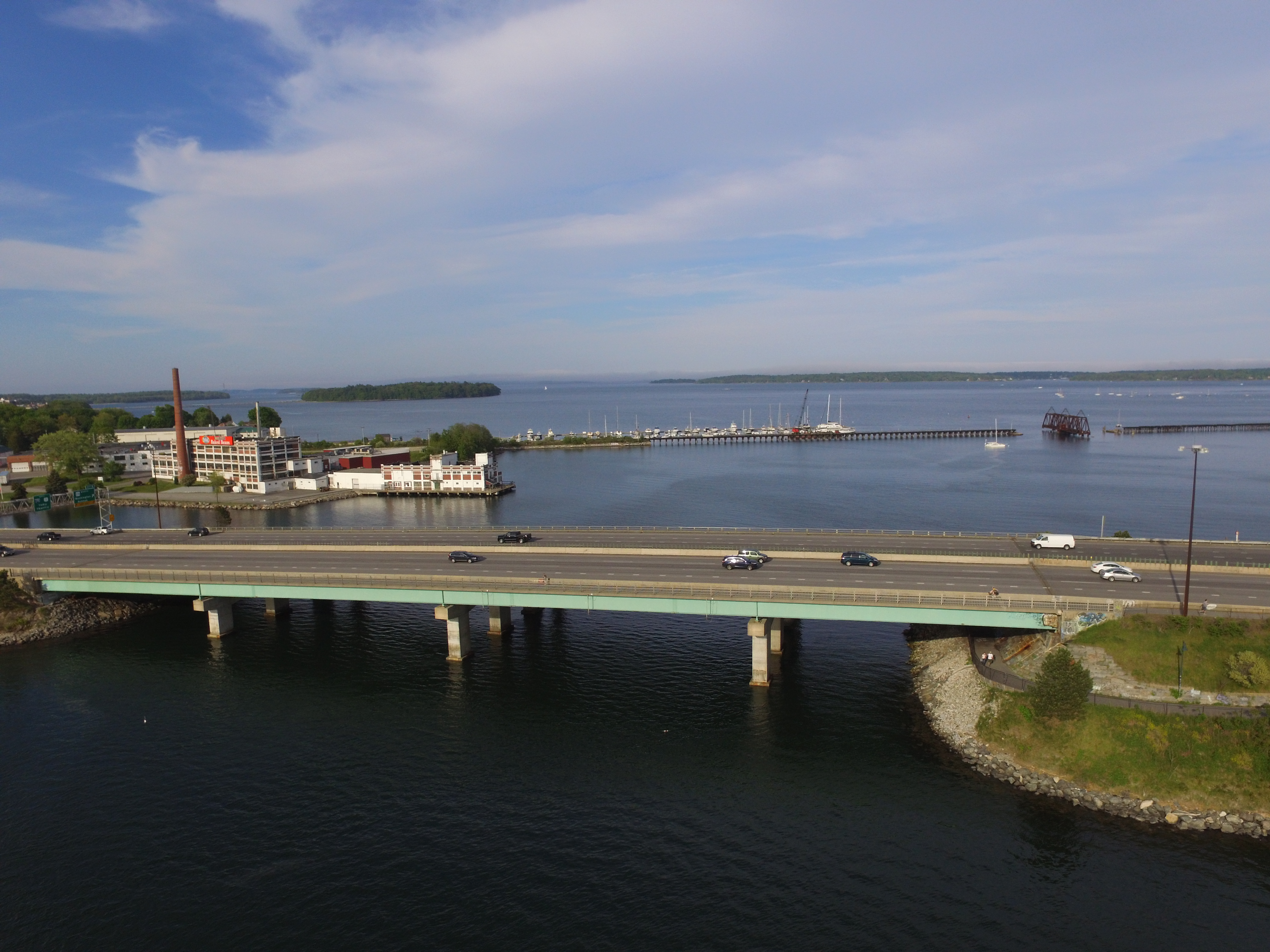
- Washington Avenue crosses Tukey's Bridge via both the northbound and southbound exit lanes
- Interactive map of Washington Avenue
- Part of: SR 26
- Length: 5.25 mi (8.45 km)
- Location: Portland, Maine, U.S.
- Northwest end: SR 26 / SR 100 (Auburn Street)
- Southeast end: Congress Street & Mountfort Street

Washington Avenue (formerly known as Main Street; known colloquially as Washington Ave) is a major street in Portland, Maine, United States. It runs for around 5.25 miles (8.45 km), from Auburn Street in the northwest to Congress Street in the southeast. It continues in parallel with Interstate 295 as it crosses Tukey's Bridge between exits 8 and 9. It is the main artery for traffic entering and leaving Portland to and from the north via city streets, and has been described as a "gateway to the Portland peninsula." Washington Avenue passes to the north of Back Cove, while Forest Avenue passes to its south.

Washington Avenue is part of State Route 26 for its entire course. It picks up the designation from Auburn Street, which continues as State Route 100 south of its intersection with Washington Avenue.

== Route ==
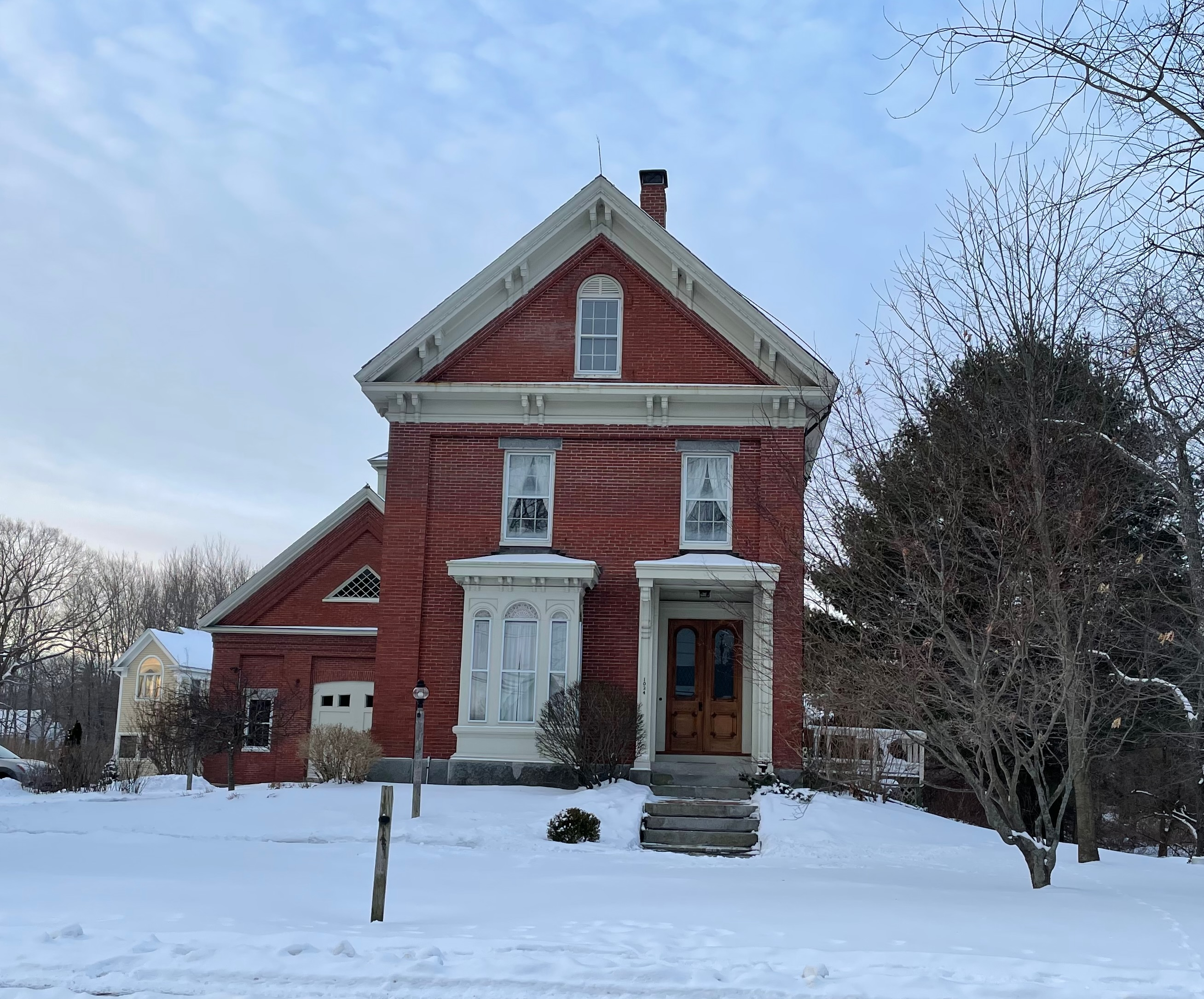
Sherburne House, 1024 Washington Avenue

Forest Avenue picks up the State Route 26 designation from Auburn Street (which is also State Route 100) just south of the Falmouth Spur, which connects Interstate 295 (I-295) and U.S. Route 1 (US 1) to Interstate 95 (I-95). Its northernmost section, between Auburn Street and Summit Street, is known as Washington Avenue Extension. It continues solely as Washington Avenue past Riverside Street, close to I-95, before turning southeasterly. It meets Auburn Street again near the Northgate Plaza, running alongside it to the south for the final few yards of Auburn Street's course. Allen Avenue picks up the SR 100 designation at the next intersection as it continues southwesterly.

Washington Avenue continues through North Deering, past Canco Road and across Fall Brook, to an intersection with Ocean Avenue (State Route 9). It then approaches the northern shores of Back Cove in East Deering, passing Presumpscot Street, before reaching an intersection with Bates Street, Veranda Street and the exit 9 ramps to and from I-295. It continues, in parallel with I-295 and US 1, on the southbound exit lanes of Tukey's Bridge between exits 9 and 8, where it exits on the left ramp of two en route to and from downtown Portland, terminating at Congress Street at the southern edge of Munjoy Hill. Part of its final section, up to its intersection with Cumberland Avenue (SR 100), has become notable for its restaurants.

== Public transportation ==
Greater Portland Metro's routes 9A and 9B (North Deering/West Falmouth) serves Washington Avenue on its northern section; they are joined by route 7 on the southern section.
