= Payson Park =

Public park in Portland, Maine

Coordinates: 43°40′53″N 70°16′03″W

Edward Payson Park
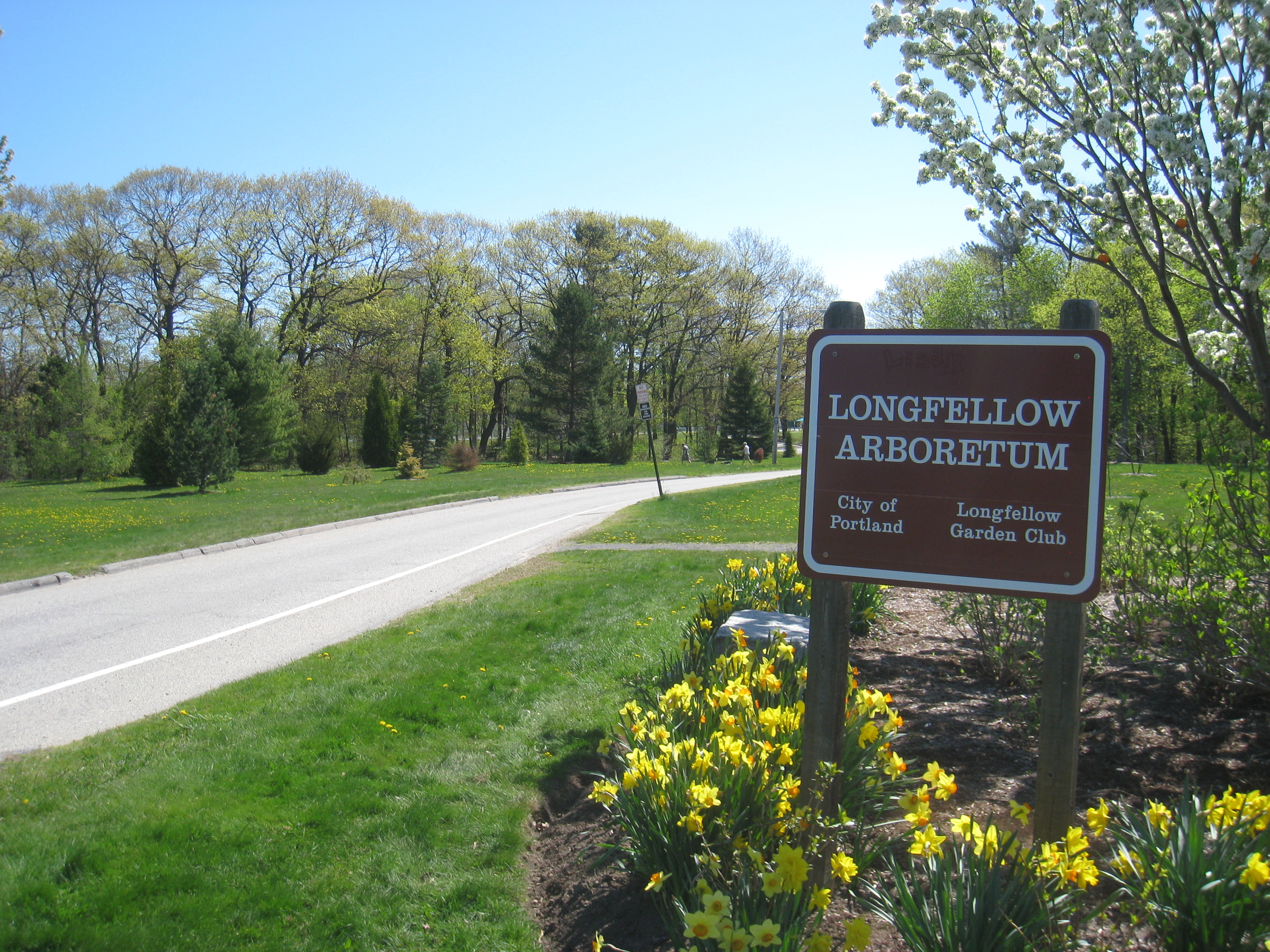
- Longfellow Arboretum in Payson Park
- Interactive map of Edward Payson Park
- Type: Park
- Location: Portland, Maine, United States
- Area: 47.75 acres (19.32 ha)
- Operator: City of Portland, Maine
- Website: Official website

Edward Payson Park is a 47.5-acre (19.2 ha) public park in the Back Cove neighborhood of Portland, Maine. The park is bordered by Ocean Avenue to the north and Baxter Boulevard to the south. The offices of the Roman Catholic Diocese of Portland are located across from the park on Ocean Avenue.

== History ==
The land on which the park was built was part of the Payson estate. It was owned by Rev. Edward Payson, who was a prominent Congregationalist preacher. His son of the same name lived near the park in the Payson House. The Payson House was built in the 1850s before being demolished in 1956. In 1917, Portland purchased the property from William Martin Payson of Boston for $26,262. In 1921, William Martin Payson left a bequest of $2,500 to the city to pay for entrance and gates to the park.

== Longfellow Arboretum ==
The Longfellow Arboretum is a 2.5-acre (1.0 ha) arboretum on the southwestern corner the park beside a small tidal marsh which connects the park to Back Cove. As of August 2016, there are 125 trees, including approximately 40 non-native trees, including Betula nigra, Cercidiphyllum, and Stewartia.

The Longfellow Garden Club, a member of the National Garden Club and the Garden Club Federation of Maine, created the Longfellow Arboretum on land donated by the City of Portland using a bequest from Mrs. Clifford Leys, a former member. Today the Longfellow Garden Club and the City of Portland jointly maintain the Arboretum. It is named in honor of American poet Henry Wadsworth Longfellow, who grew up in Portland's Wadsworth-Longfellow House.

== Facilities ==
Payson Park has multiple sports facilities, including a playground, baseball and softball fields, and a basketball court. It is also a known as a top location for sliding and in 2008, Payson Hill Terrain Park, a ski, snowboard, and sledding terrain park located on the park's western edge, formalized this space to encourage children to take up the sports. It was the only municipal park in the United States to offer free skiing and riding lessons. It is also home to a community garden.

== See also ==
- List of botanical gardens in the United States
