= Martin's Point =

- Promontory
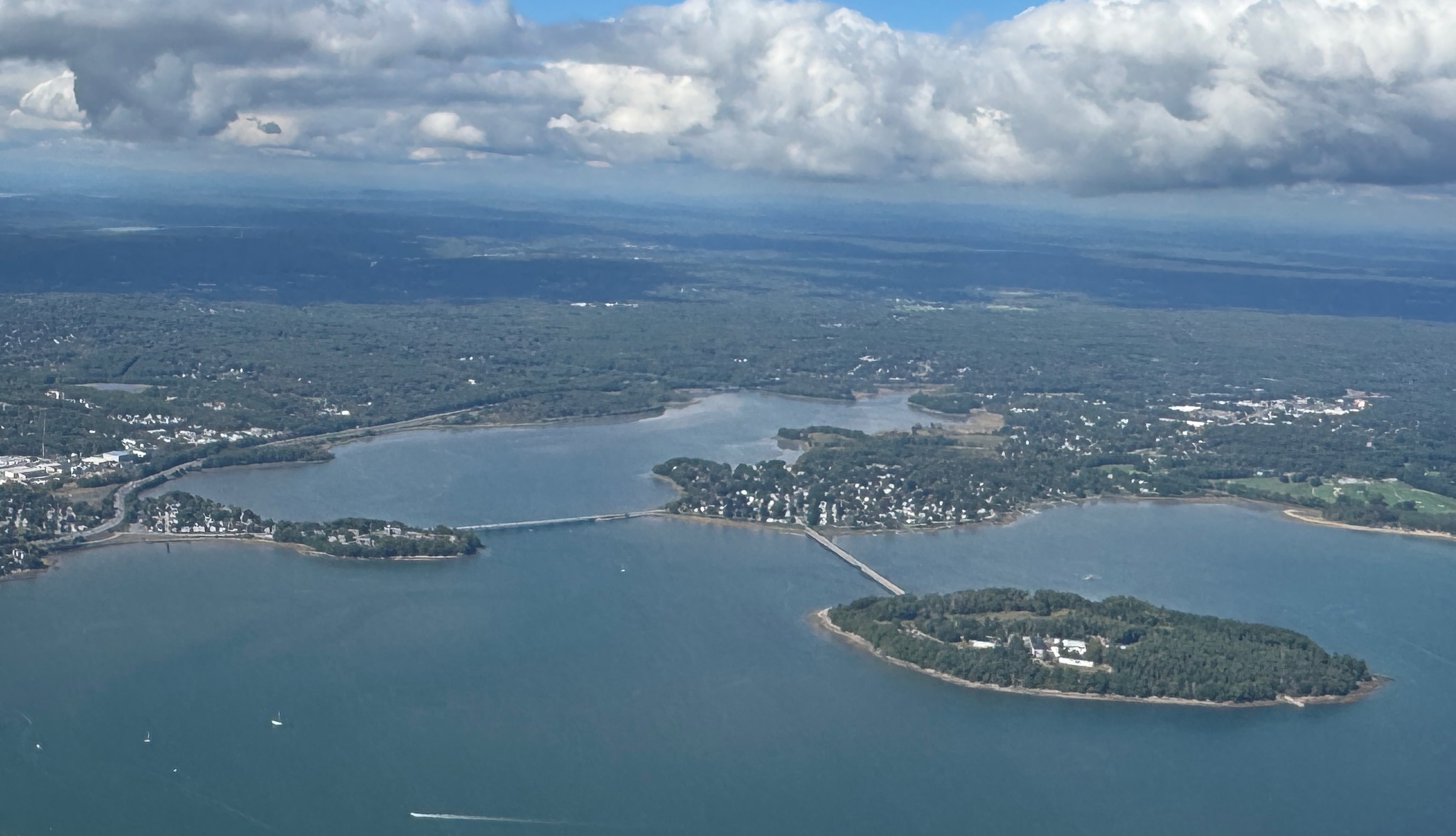
- A 2024 aerial view of Martin's Point (left), Mackworth Point (center) and Mackworth Island
- Interactive map of Martin's Point
- Coordinates: 43.68886582°N 70.2462372°W
- Country: United States
- State: Maine
- County: Cumberland
- Town: Portland
- Named for: Richard Martin
- Time zone: UTC-5 (Eastern (EST))
  - Summer (DST): UTC-4 (EDT)

Martin's Point is a promontory in Portland, Maine, United States. It is located on the southern side of the Presumpscot River, at its confluence with Casco Bay, in the East Deering neighborhood of the city. It is named for Richard Martin, an early settler in Casco Bay.

The point is connected to Mackworth Point, in Falmouth Foreside on the northern side of the river, by the Martin's Point Bridge, which carries vehicular and pedestrian traffic of U.S. Route 1 (named Veranda Street on the southern approach). There has been a crossing at this location since 1828; the current bridge was completed in 2014.

Martin's Point Health Care occupies the location today.
