= Martin's Point Bridge =

Bridge in Portland, Maine, U.S.

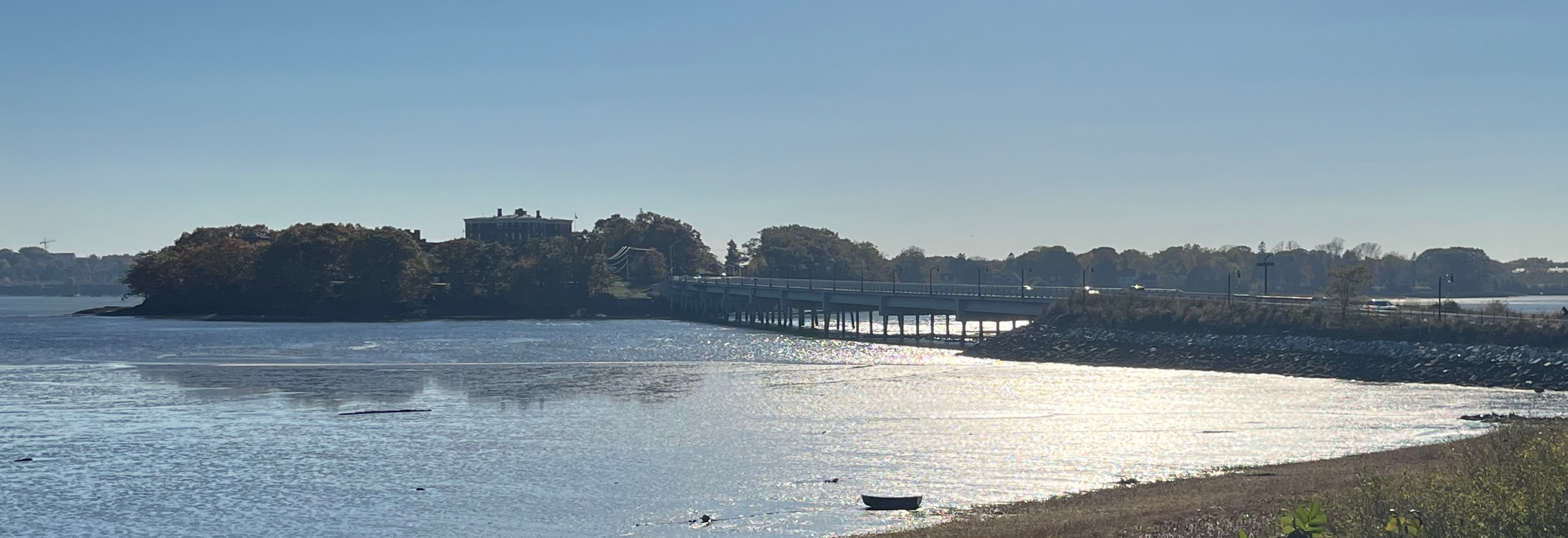
- The bridge viewed from Mackworth Point in 2022, looking southwest
- Coordinates: 43.691671740°N 70.244890°W
- Carries: US 1 U.S. Route 1
- Crosses: Presumpscot River
- Locale: Falmouth Foreside, Maine and Portland, Maine, U.S.

Characteristics
- Total length: 1,300 feet (396 m)

History
- Opened: 2014 (11 years ago)

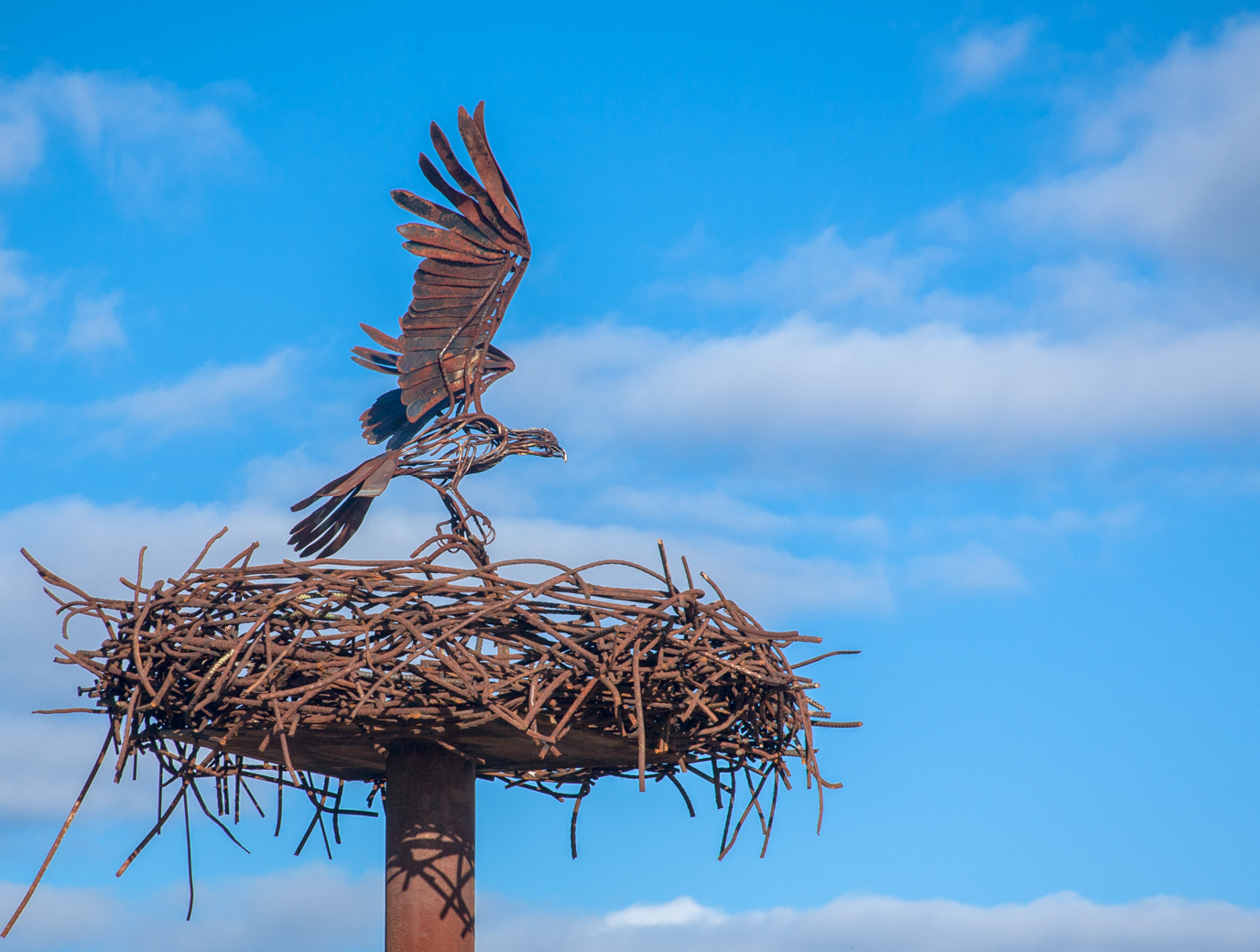
This sculpture of a nesting osprey was part of the current bridge's construction in 2014. It is the work of New Hampshire sculptor Wendy Klemperer

Martin's Point Bridge spans the Presumpscot River in Maine, United States, near the river’s mouth with Casco Bay. It connects Falmouth Foreside, at Mackworth Point, in the north, to the East Deering neighborhood of Portland, at Martin's Point, in the south. 1,300 feet (400 m) in length, it carries vehicular and pedestrian traffic of U.S. Route 1. The bridge is two lanes, including a bicycle lane in each, with a pedestrian lane on the eastern side. A similar plan for the western side of the bridge was abandoned.

The bridge passes around 0.5 miles (0.80 km) to the west of Mackworth Island and around 0.6 miles (0.97 km) east of Interstate 295 on the banks of the river. Route 1 joins I-295 a short distance to the south at the Veranda Street interchange.

The first bridge was erected in 1828. Today's bridge, completed in 2014, is the fifth iteration, replacing one that was built in 1943.

As of 2015, the bridge carries around 15,000 vehicles each day. It is part of the 3,000-mile long East Coast Greenway connecting Maine and Florida.

== History ==
In 1807, Ammi Ruhamah Mitchell and others petitioned for a bridge to provide a crossing of the Presumpscot River at its mouth with Casco Bay. Due to the War of 1812, plans for the bridge were put on hold.

In 1828, the Proprietors of the Martin's Point Bridge committee built the bridge, originally in toll form.

The bridge was destroyed by drifting ice in 1861. Five years later, John Williams and almost two thousand other people petitioned that the bridge be rebuilt, as a toll-free crossing, at the expense of Cumberland County. The motion was authorized, and in 1868 a new, 2,050-foot-long bridge was completed. This bridge also carried the Portland and Yarmouth Electric Railway between 1898 and 1933.

The bridge was a drawbridge in the 20th century.

The Smelt Hill Dam, the first upriver dam from the bridge, was demolished in 2002. The process revealed the Presumpscot Falls for the first time in several hundred years.
