= Grand Trunk Cemetery =

Historic cemetery in Portland, Cumberland County, Maine, US

- Interactive map of Grand Trunk Cemetery

Details
- Established: 1793
- Location: Portland, Maine
- Country: United States
- Coordinates: 43°41′03″N 70°15′29″W
- Owned by: City of Portland, Maine
- No. of graves: ≈50+
- Website: Website
- Find a Grave: Grand Trunk Cemetery

The Grand Trunk Cemetery also known as (Back Cove Cemetery or East Deering Cemetery) is a small inactive cemetery in the East Deering neighborhood of Portland, Maine. Established around 1793, the cemetery was the burial ground for those who lived in the area until 1898, when it was declared inactive. It is now located behind Presumpscot Elementary School and is bordered to the east by main line of the Grand Trunk Railway. Largely forgotten for decades, community members began reclaiming the space and it was officially re-dedicated in 2014.

== Gallery ==
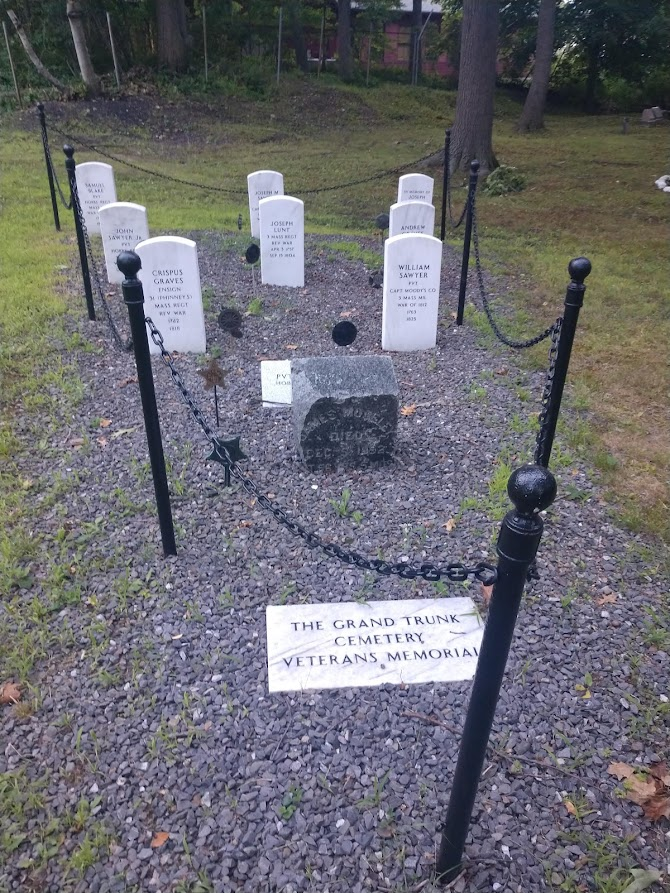
Circa 2020

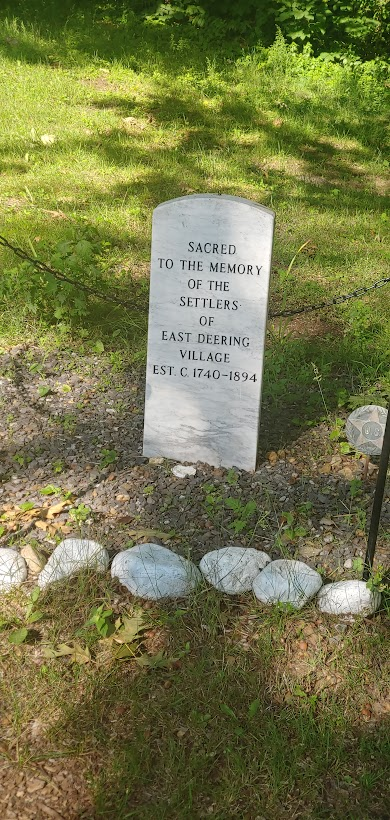
Circa 2018
