= John B. Russwurm House =

Historic house in Maine, US

- U.S. National Register of Historic Places
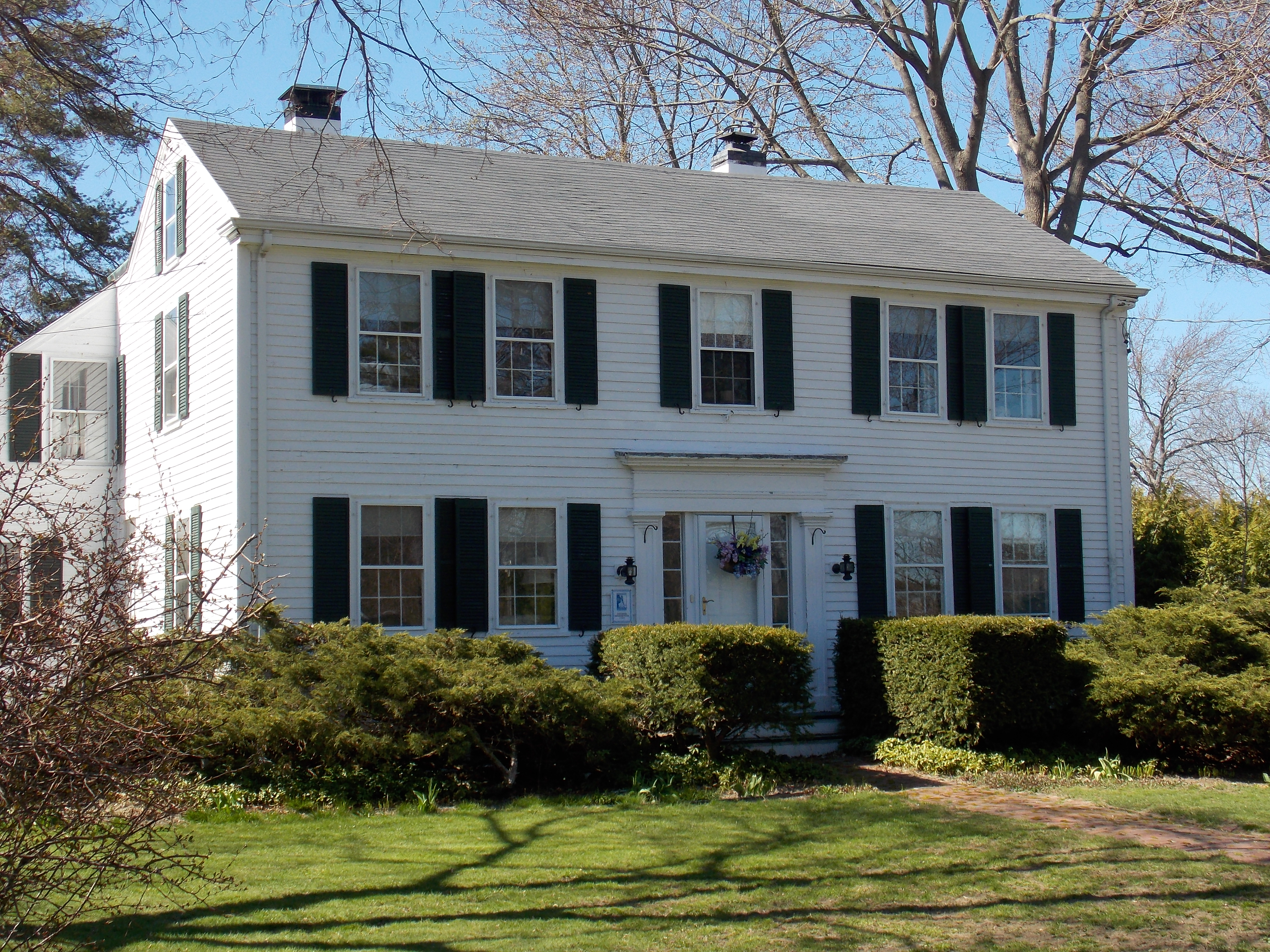

- Location within Maine Location within the United States
- Location: 238 Ocean Avenue, Portland, Maine
- Coordinates: 43°40′44″N 70°16′49″W
- Built: c. 1810
- NRHP reference No.: 83000450
- Added to NRHP: July 21, 1983

The John B. Russwurm House is a historic house at 238 Ocean Avenue in the Back Cove neighborhood of Portland, Maine. Built about 1810, it was the residence of American abolitionist and Liberian colonist John Brown Russwurm. The house was listed on the National Register of Historic Places in 1983.

== Description and history ==
The Russwurm House is located on the northwest side of Ocean Avenue (Maine State Route 9), between Gleckler and Wellington Roads. It is set back from the road, just south of the Church of the Holy Spirit. It is a typical Federal period 2 1/2-story wood-frame structure, with a five-bay front facade and side gable roof. It is one room deep, and has a center entrance with a modest Greek Revival surround that includes sidelights and pilasters. A single-story ell extends to the rear on the left side, its gabled roof perpendicular to the main roof. The interior has a narrow stair in the entrance vestibule, with a Greek Revival parlor to the left and a Federal period parlor to the right.

This house was built about 1810, and was from 1812 to 1827 intermittently the home of John Brown Russwurm. Russwurm was born in Jamaica to white plantation owner, John R. Russwurm, and an enslaved black woman. His father died in 1815, and his stepmother, Susan, lived there with her third husband, local miller William Hawes, after their marriage in 1817.

Educated at Hebron Academy and Bowdoin College (where he was the first African-American to graduate), he was co-editor of Freedom's Journal, the first newspaper in America owned and published by African-Americans. He was active in abolitionist circles, and was a proponent of returning blacks to Africa. In 1836, he was chosen to serve as the first black governor of Maryland in Africa, a colony which eventually became part of Liberia. This house is the only known property in the United States associated with his life.

== See also ==
- National Register of Historic Places listings in Portland, Maine
