= Lemuel Tukey =

American businessman

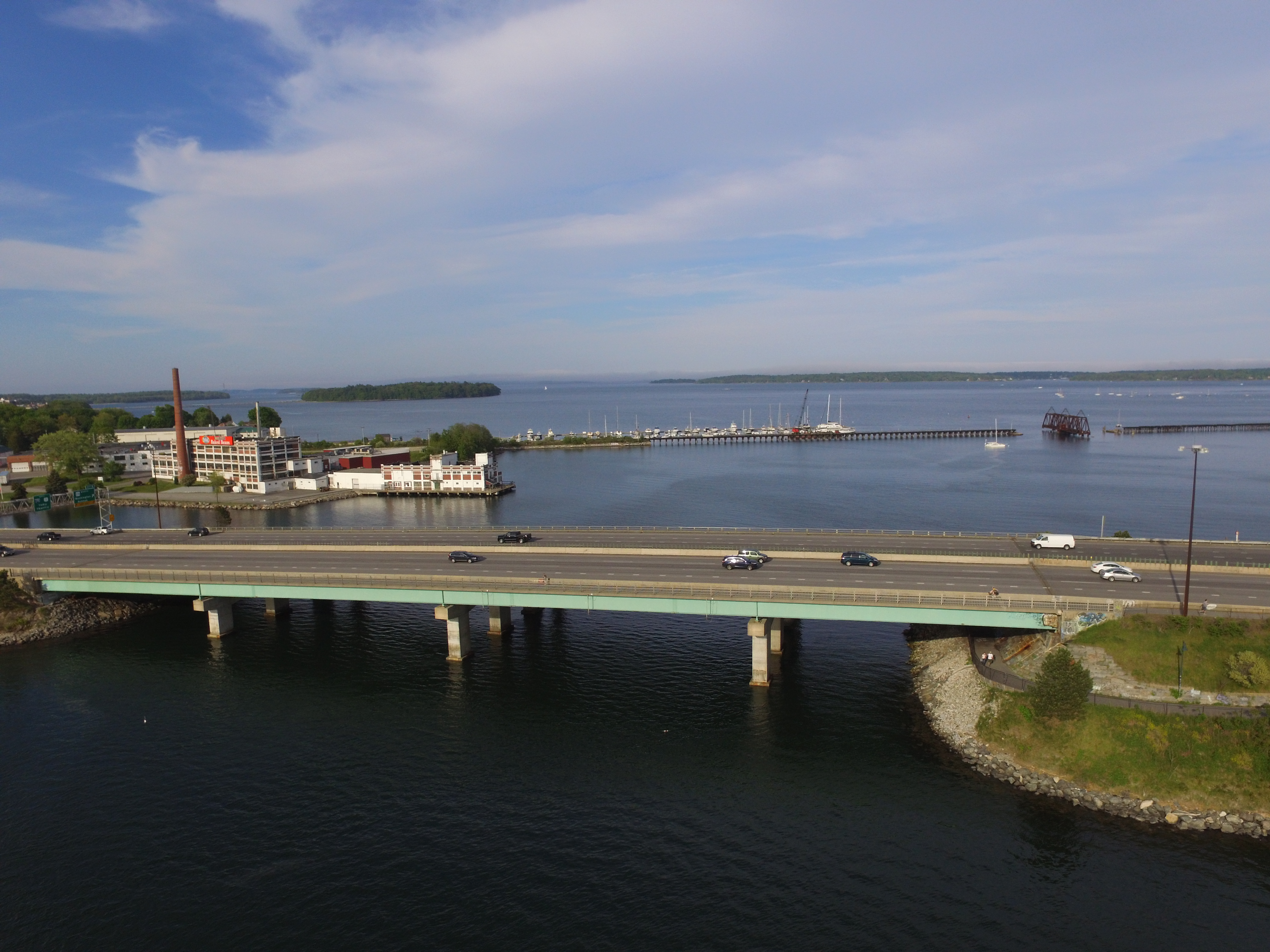
- Tukey's Bridge, looking east from Back Cove into Casco Bay
- Born: August 6, 1766; Falmouth, Province of Massachusetts Bay, Colonial America
- Died: July 22, 1835 (aged 68); Portland, Maine, U.S.
- Occupations: Tavern owner, tax collector

Lemuel Tukey (August 6, 1766 – July 22, 1835) was an American businessman from Portland, Maine, United States. The city's Tukey's Bridge is named for him. He ran a tavern on the Portland end of a previous version of the bridge, which was completed in 1796, and objected to the city's decision to end the collection of tolls, so he collected them anyway until he was forced to stop in the early 1830s.

In the Portland Directory of 1823, Tukey is listed as a distiller with a residence on Mountfort Street.

== Personal life ==
Tukey was born in 1766, to John and Abigail (née Sweetsir) Tukey, one of their fourteen children, all born in Falmouth, Province of Massachusetts Bay (today's Portland, Maine). William, one of his brothers, helped construct Portland Head Light.

He married, first, Sarah Snow, then her sister, Eunice. Tukey had at least one child, a daughter, Jane (c. 1808 – 1869). She named one of her children after her father. Lemuel Tukey Jr. (1839–1865) died, aged 26, shortly after fighting in—and being taken captive during—the battle of the Wilderness.

== Death ==
Tukey died in 1835, aged 68.
