= Mackworth Point =

- Promontory
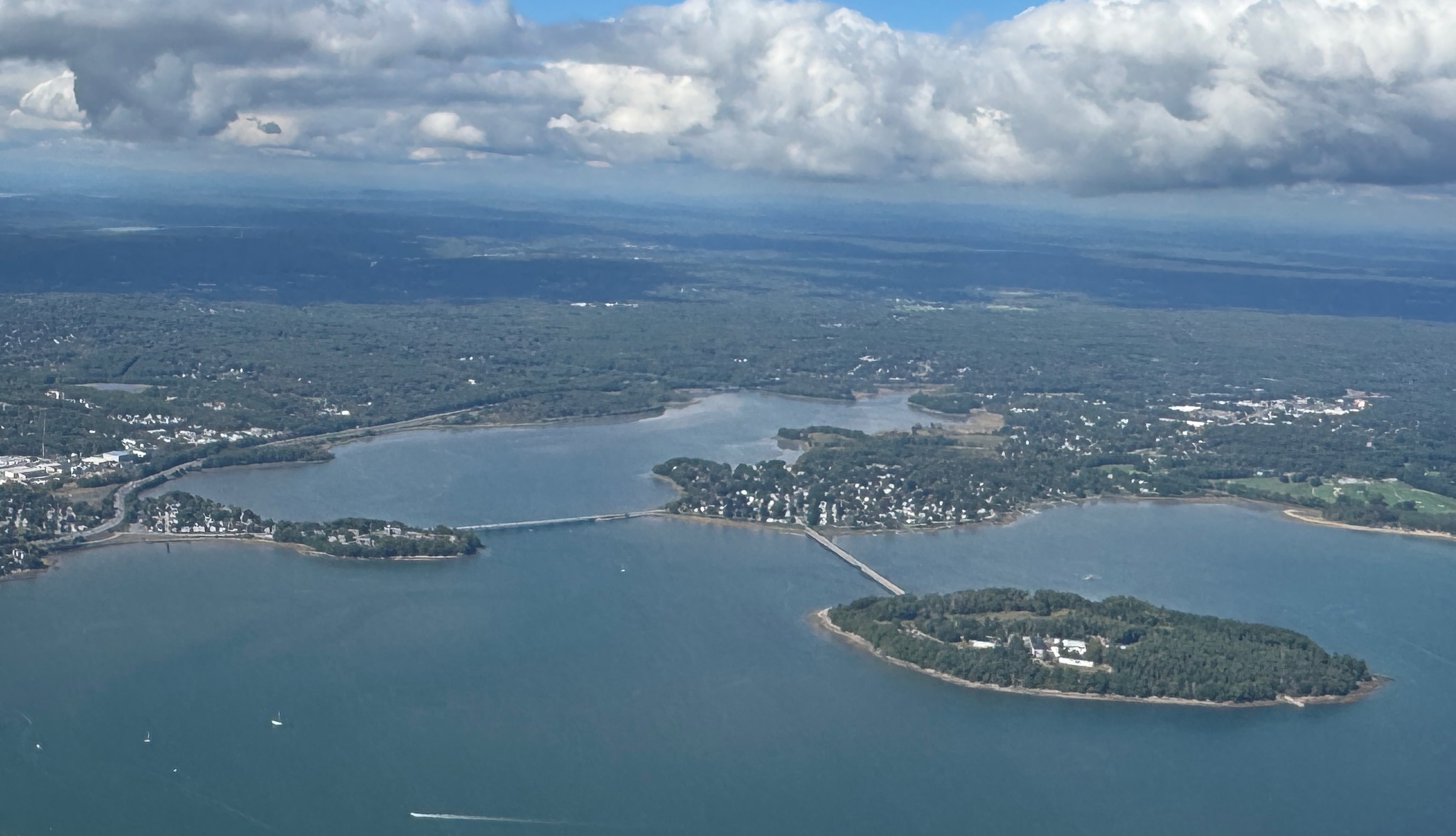
- A 2024 aerial view of Mackworth Point (center), along with Martin's Point (left) and Mackworth Island
- Interactive map of Mackworth Point
- Coordinates: 43.69456°N 70.24174°W
- Country: United States
- State: Maine
- County: Cumberland
- Town: Falmouth Foreside
- Time zone: UTC-5 (Eastern (EST))
  - Summer (DST): UTC-4 (EDT)

Mackworth Point is a promontory in Falmouth Foreside, Maine, United States. It is located on the northern side of the Presumpscot River, at its confluence with Casco Bay, and it shares its name with Mackworth Island, located a short distance away. Both are named for Arthur Mackworth, deputy to Sir Ferdinando Gorges.

The point is connected to Martin's Point, in Portland, on the southern side of the river, by the Martin's Point Bridge, which carries vehicular and pedestrian traffic of U.S. Route 1. There has been a crossing at this location since 1828; the current bridge was completed in 2014.

Andrews Avenue connects Mackworth Point to Mackworth Island via a causeway.
