= Portland Water District =

Water company in Maine

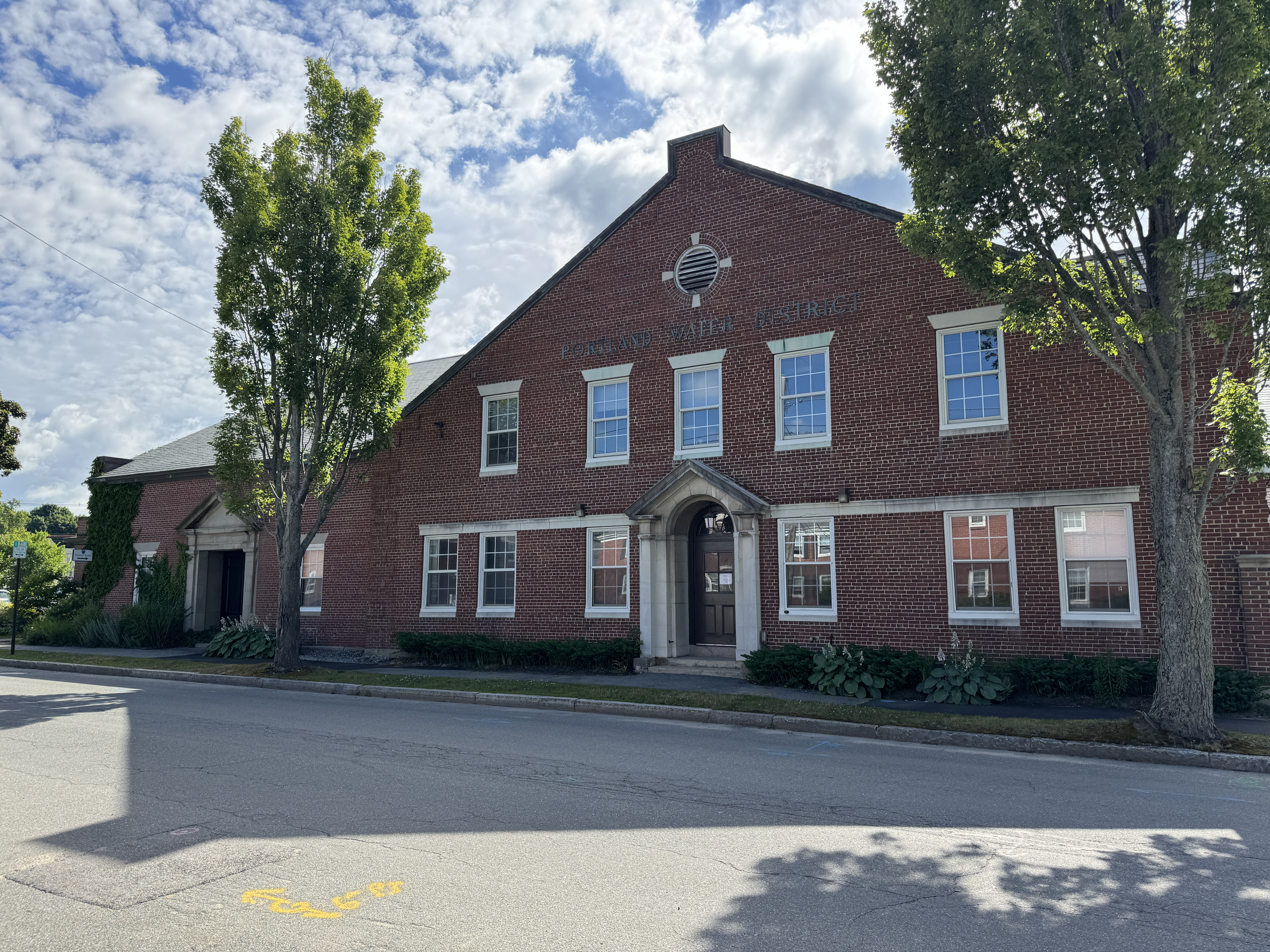
- Portland Water District's building in 2024
- Industry: Water industry
- Founded: 1862 (164 years ago)
- Headquarters: 225 Douglass Street, Portland, Maine, U.S.
- Area served: Southern Maine
- Key people: Seth Garrison (general manager)
- Number of employees: 186
- Website: www.pwd.org

Portland Water District (PWD) is a publicly owned water company based Portland, Maine, United States. It was established, as Portland Water Company (PWC), in 1862 by a group of Portland citizens as a private company as a means to ensure continued growth. The wells which had been used up to that point were proving inadequate. Its water is sourced from Sebago Lake, Maine's second-largest lake, as it has been since 1869.

In September 1869, PWC moved their office to the room above the Evening Express newspaper office on the now-demolished Plum Street. (Plum Street connected Fore Street and Middle Street between Exchange Street and Union Street.)

Portland Water District purchased Portland Water Company and the Standish Water and Construction Company in 1908, and initially served Portland, South Portland, Cape Elizabeth and Westbrook. It also provided water for Gorham Water Company and Falmouth Water Company. Over the next two decades, PWD began supplying water to Cumberland, Falmouth, Gorham and the islands of Casco Bay. Toward the end of the 20th century, the company expanded several times, including improving its infrastructure by constructing water-supply systems to serve Steep Falls, Standish and North Windham.

Toward the end of the 20th century, the Clean Water Act (1972) and Safe Drinking Water Act (1974) mandated that a new disinfection plant be constructed. It was built at Sebago Lake in 1994.

PWD runs the East End Treatment Plant. It has also built treatment plants in Westbrook, Little Falls, Cape Elizabeth and Peaks Island.

The company, which delivers an average of 21 million gallons of water each day, has 186 employees. It maintains over 5,000 hydrants, around 115 miles (185 km) of pipelines and 76 pump stations. Its headquarters are at 225 Douglass Street in Portland. The facility, which was designed by John Calvin Stevens and his son John Howard Stevens, opened in 1928.
