= East End Treatment Plant =

Water treatment plant in Portland, Maine

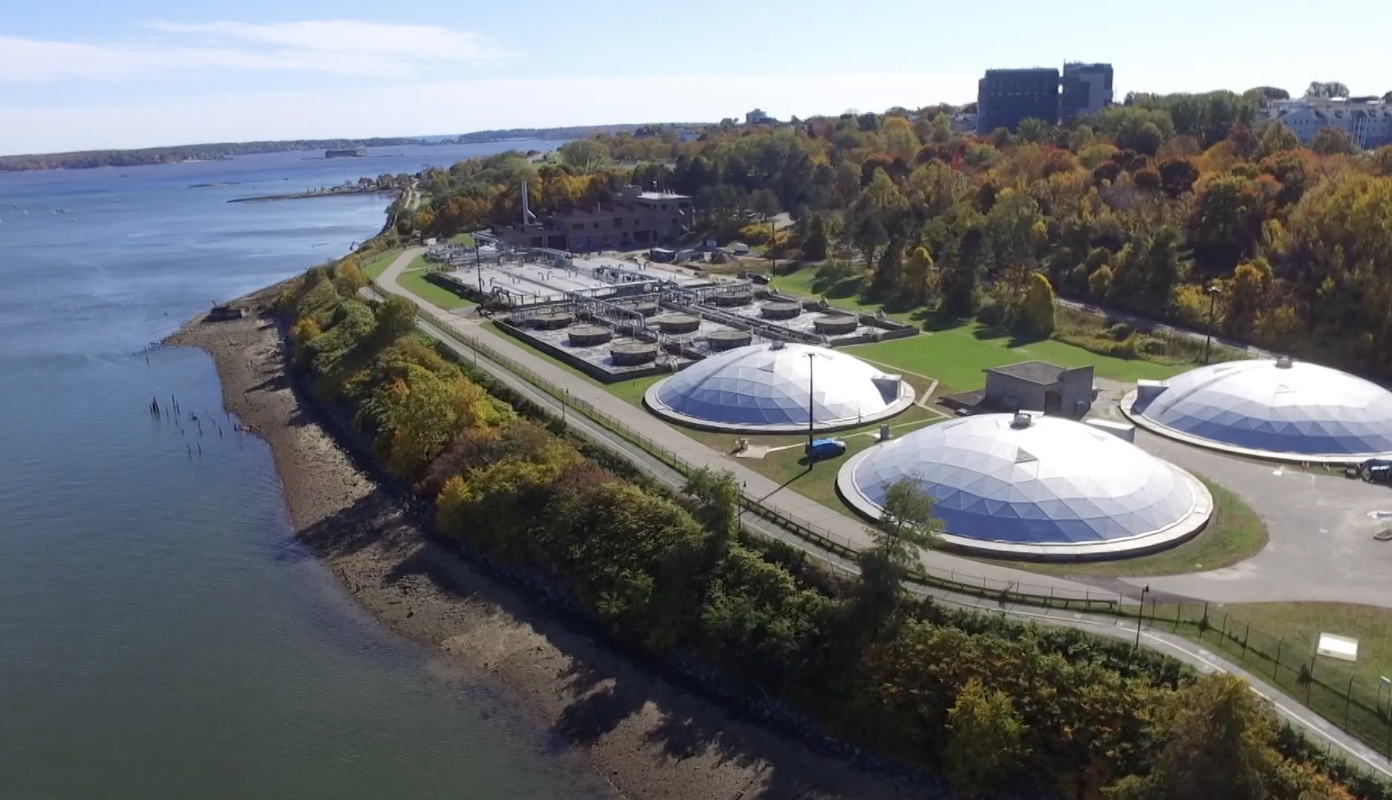
- The facility viewed from above Tukey's Bridge in 2023

- Location within Maine
- Interactive map of East End Treatment Plant
- Coordinates: 43.673377°N 70.253689°W
- Daily capacity: 20 million gallons
- Operation date: 1979 (47 years ago)

The East End Treatment Plant is a water-treatment facility located in Portland, Maine, United States. At an average daily output of almost 20 million gallons, it is the largest treatment facility in the state. In operation since 1979, and run by Portland Water District, the plant sits at the opposite (southern) end of Tukey's Bridge from the former B&M Baked Beans factory.

In addition to producing clean water, which flows into nearby Casco Bay, the facility also created hundreds of tons of treated biosolids. Around four million tons of septage from private septic systems in Maine's cities and towns are sent to the facility each year. The plant prevents around 9,000,000 pounds (4,100,000 kg) of pollution from entering Casco Bay on an annual basis.

In 2018, the plant received a $12 million upgrade. In the summer of that year, over one million gallons of partially treated sewage was released into Casco Bay after a disinfection tank was not powered on after being cleaned. A second tank was overwhelmed by high rainfall. The plant was fined $16,800 by the Maine Department of Environmental Protection. The penalty was used to pay for restoration work at the city's Evergreen Cemetery.

Another discharge occurred in July 2020, when nearly four million gallons of partially treated sewage was released into Casco Bay after a power failure at the plant. East End Beach, which was given a rebirth shortly after the plant came online in 1979, was temporarily closed.

In 2023, plans to upgrade the secondary clarifier and primary sludge gallery at a cost of just over $5 million, financed by the Maine Department of Environmental Protection and Maine Municipal Bond Bank as part of the State Revolving Loan Fund Program. Penta Corporation won the bid to undertake the work.
