= Albert Brenner Glickman Family Library =

Academic library in Maine, United States

Coordinates: 43°39′45″N 70°16′21″W

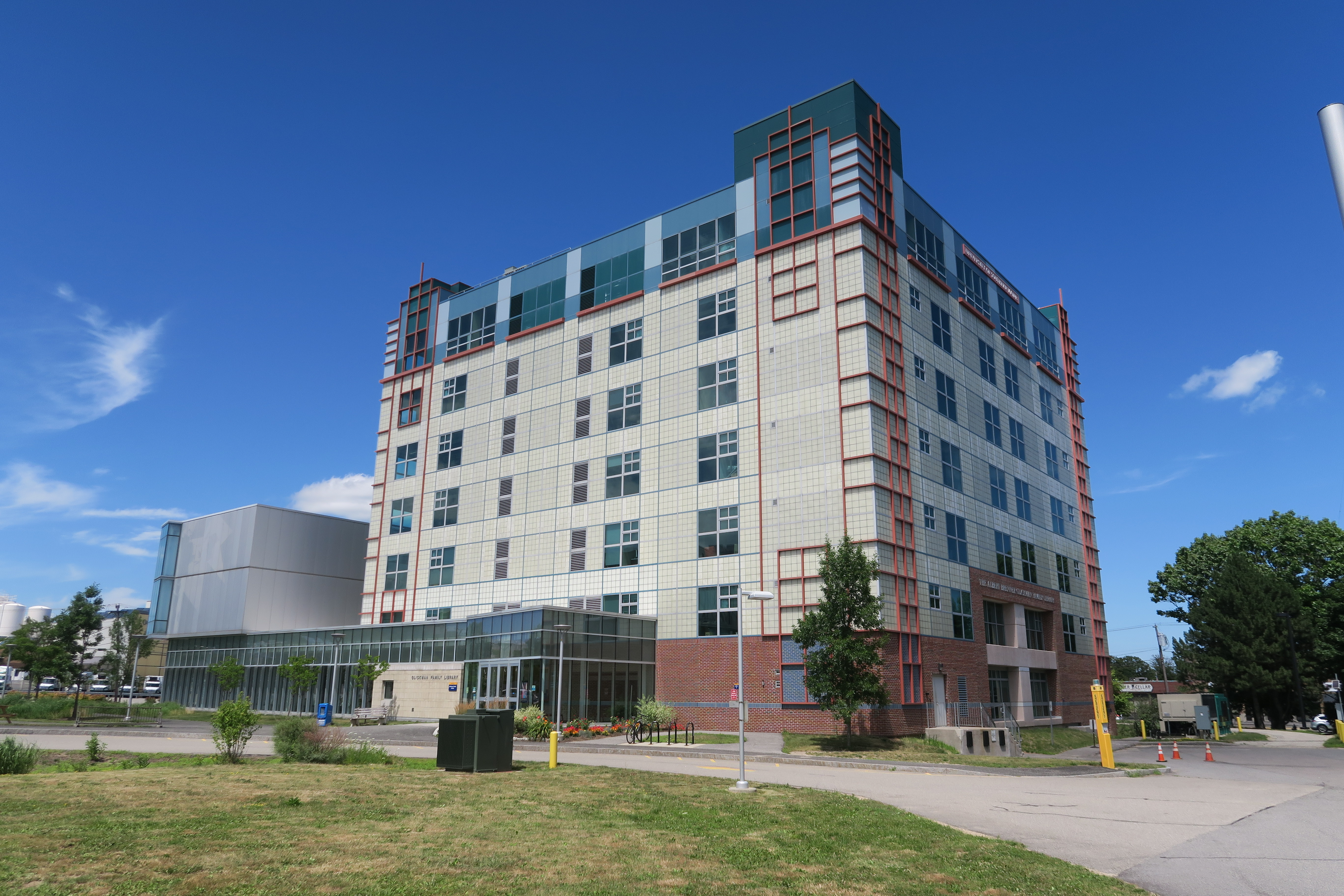
Albert Brenner Glickman Family Library, Portland Maine

The Albert Brenner Glickman Family Library (formerly the Portland Campus Library) is an academic library operated by the University of Southern Maine on its campus in Portland, Maine. The building, which stands 7 stories tall, was dedicated by Governor Angus King in October 1997. It was named after the Glickman family following a $1 million donation to the university which added the top three floors to the structure.

The library is home to a number of collections, including Osher Map Library on the first floor and the Maine Philanthropy Center on the third floor.

During the fall semester of 2011, the second floor of the library and the bottom floor of the Gorham campus library were remodeled into learning commons area which sought to centralize resources for all students.
