= Baxter Boulevard =

Boulevard and parkway in Portland, Maine

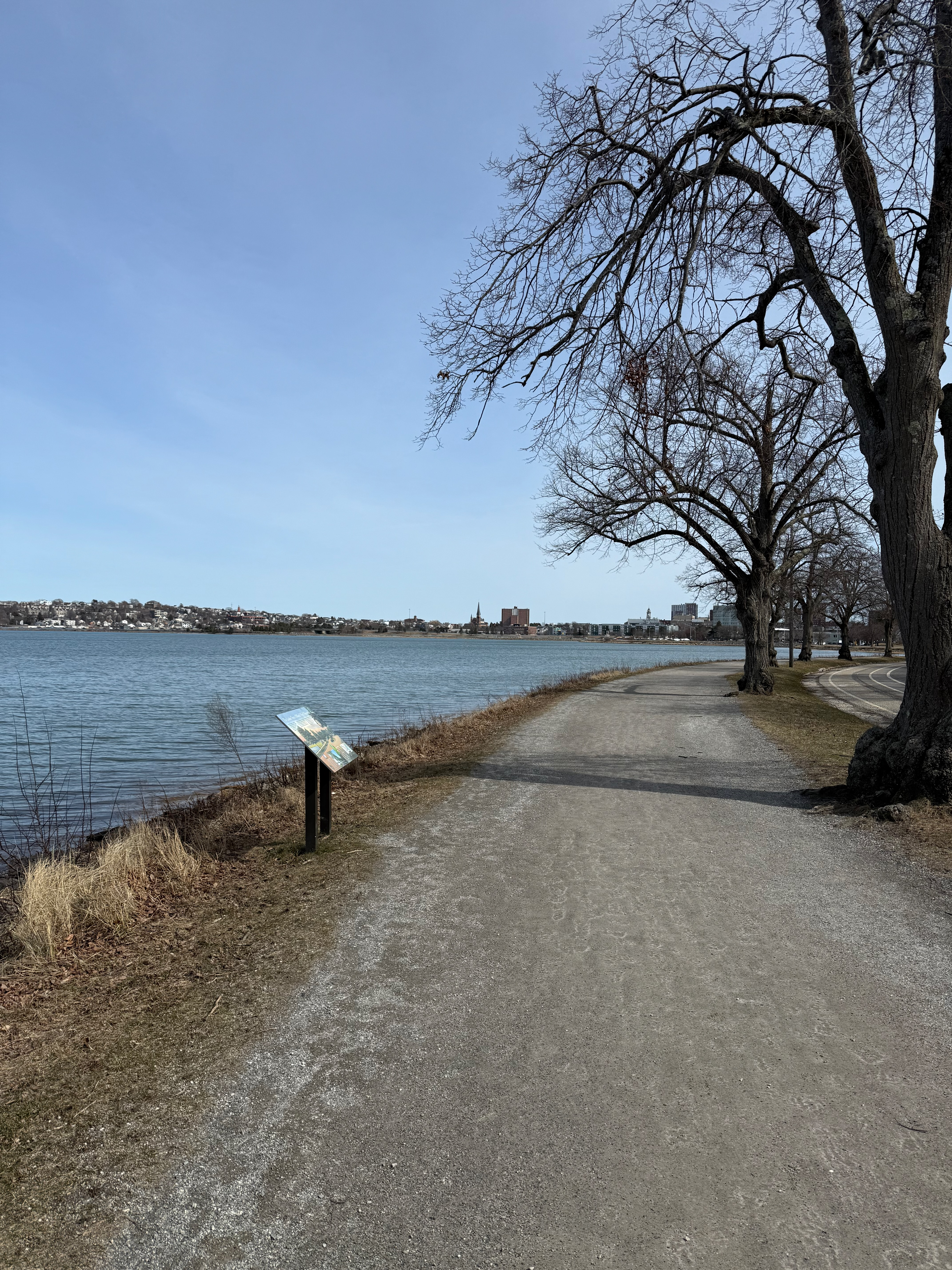
- Pictured in 2025
- Maintained by: City of Portland, Maine
- Length: 1.91 mi (3.07 km)
- Location: Portland, Maine
- Northeast end: Bates Street & I-295
- Southwest end: US 302 / SR 100 Forest Avenue & Bedford Street

Construction
- Completion: 1917

Baxter Boulevard is a boulevard and parkway in Portland, Maine. The road, around 1.91 miles (3.07 km) long, served as the means to head north from downtown Portland before Tukey's Bridge, now on Interstate 295 (I-295), was built. The road was part of U.S. Route 1 (US 1) until May 2007. The parkway wraps around the west side of Back Cove estuary basin.

The parkway and roadway began as an initiative of Mayor James Phinney Baxter, for whom it is named. It was envisioned as one of four parks in the city (along with Deering Oaks, Western Promenade and Eastern Promenade) which would encircle the city. The parkway was designed by the noted landscape design firm Olmsted, Olmsted and Eliot in 1895. Property owners donated the then-useless land next to the cove and the walking and biking path were filled in to create the Back Cove Trail. Originally called the Back Cove Boulevard, the parkway opened in 1917. It covers 30 acres (12 ha).

Tree planting began on the Boulevard in 1921 as a memorial to World War I victims.

Baxter Boulevard was listed on the National Register of Historic Places as a historic landscape district in October 1989.
