= Back Cove Trail =

Multi-use trail in Portland, Maine, United States

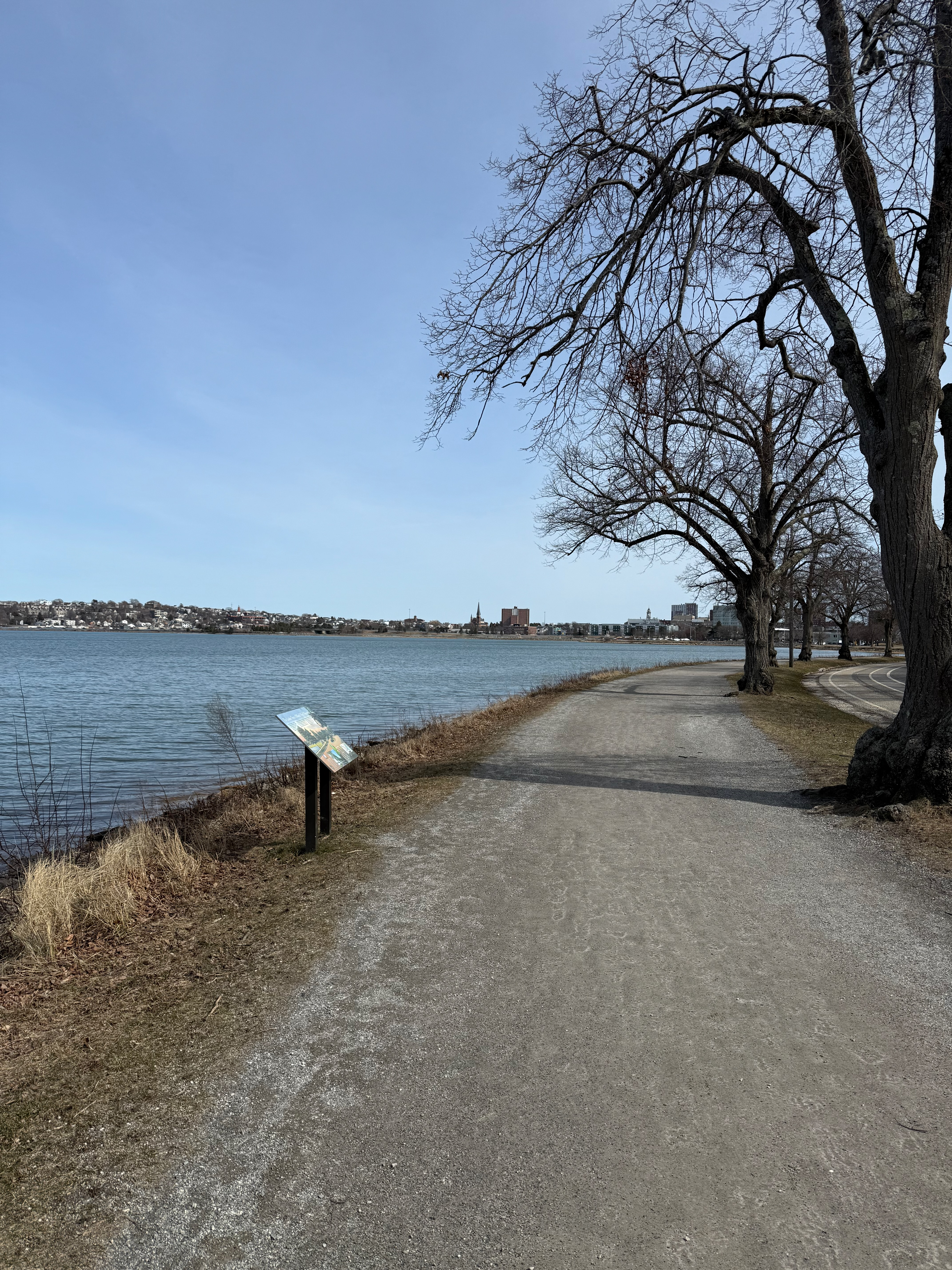
- A section of the trail beside Baxter Boulevard, looking southeast over Back Cove to the skyline of Munjoy Hill and downtown Portland
- Length: 3.6 mi (5.8 km)
- Location: Portland, Maine
- Trailheads: Preble Street Extension
- Use: Walking, running, biking, horse riding
- Difficulty: Easy

Back Cove Trail is a 3.6-mile (5.8 km) multi-use trail in Portland, Maine. It circumnavigates Back Cove, running beside (if done in the clockwise direction) Preble Street Extension, Baxter Boulevard and Interstate 295. It is one of the oldest trails in the city.

The trail's trailhead is beside the parking lot on Preble Street Extension, adjacent to Back Cove Park. Beneath Tukey's Bridge, at the mouth of Back Cove, the trail connects to the Bayside and Eastern Promenade Trails.

Portland's former mayor James Phinney Baxter envisioned the trail. It was completed in 1917, four years before Baxter's death.

== See also ==
- List of hiking trails in Maine
