= Tukey's Bridge =

Bridge in Maine, United States

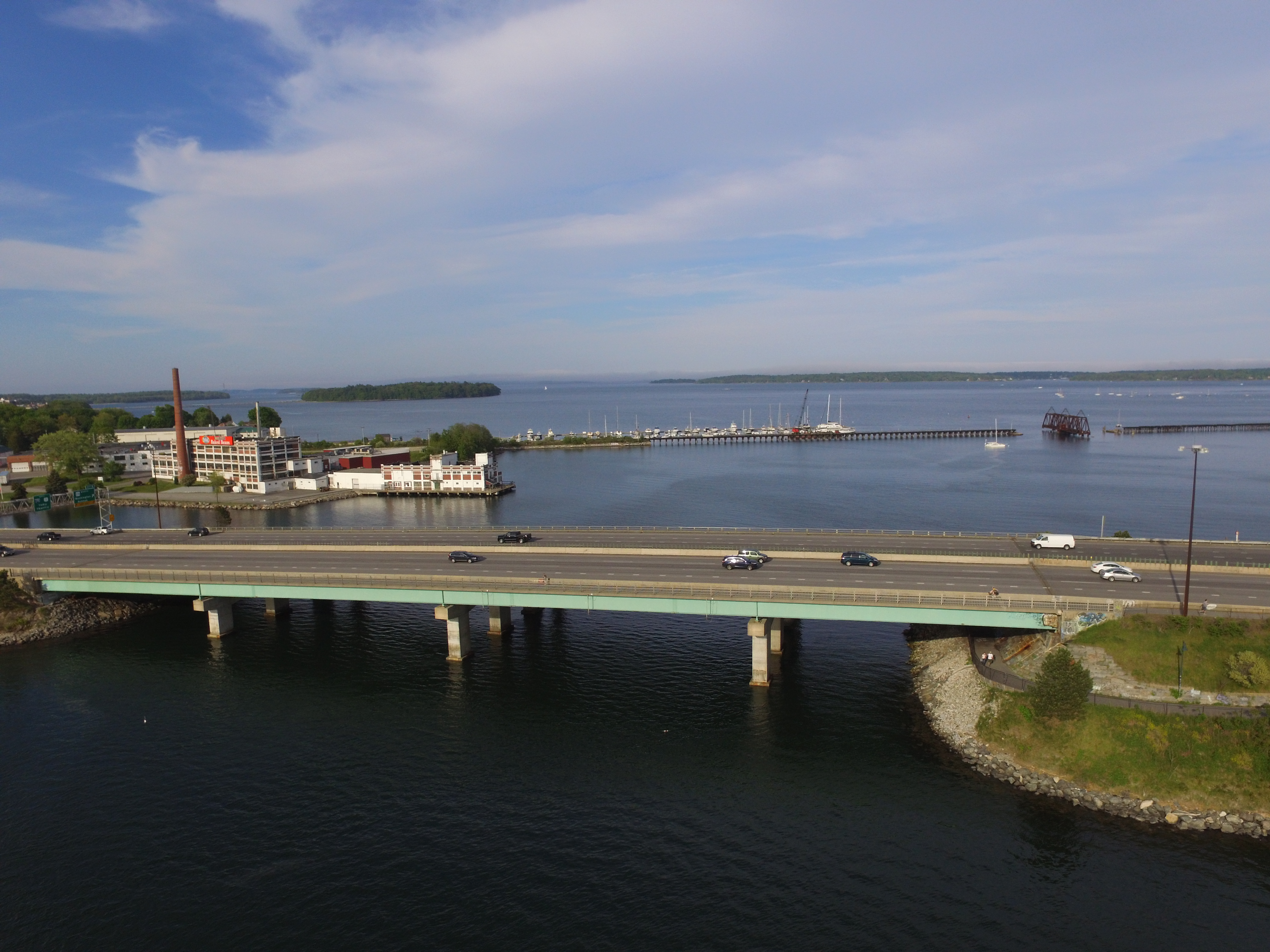
- Tukey's Bridge from the west, above Back Cove
- Coordinates: 43°40′35″N 70°15′23″W
- Carries: Eight auto lanes; I-295 / US 1 / SR 26 walking trail
- Crosses: Back Cove
- Locale: Portland, Maine

History
- Opened: 1960

Location
- Interactive map of Tukey's Bridge

Tukey's Bridge is a bridge connecting the neighborhoods of Munjoy Hill and East Deering in Portland, Maine, United States. It is part of Interstate 295, U.S. Route 1, and Washington Avenue (State Route 26).

Back Cove Trail crosses the bridge on its western side.

== History ==
Several bridges by the same name have existed connecting the areas. The current bridge was completed in 1960 and is named for Lemuel Tukey, a tavern owner and tax collector from the Back Cove area of Portland in the late 18th century. It replaced a bridge completed around 1898, and which carried the Portland and Yarmouth Electric Railway.
