= Mackworth Island =

State park in Cumberland County, Maine

Mackworth Island State Park
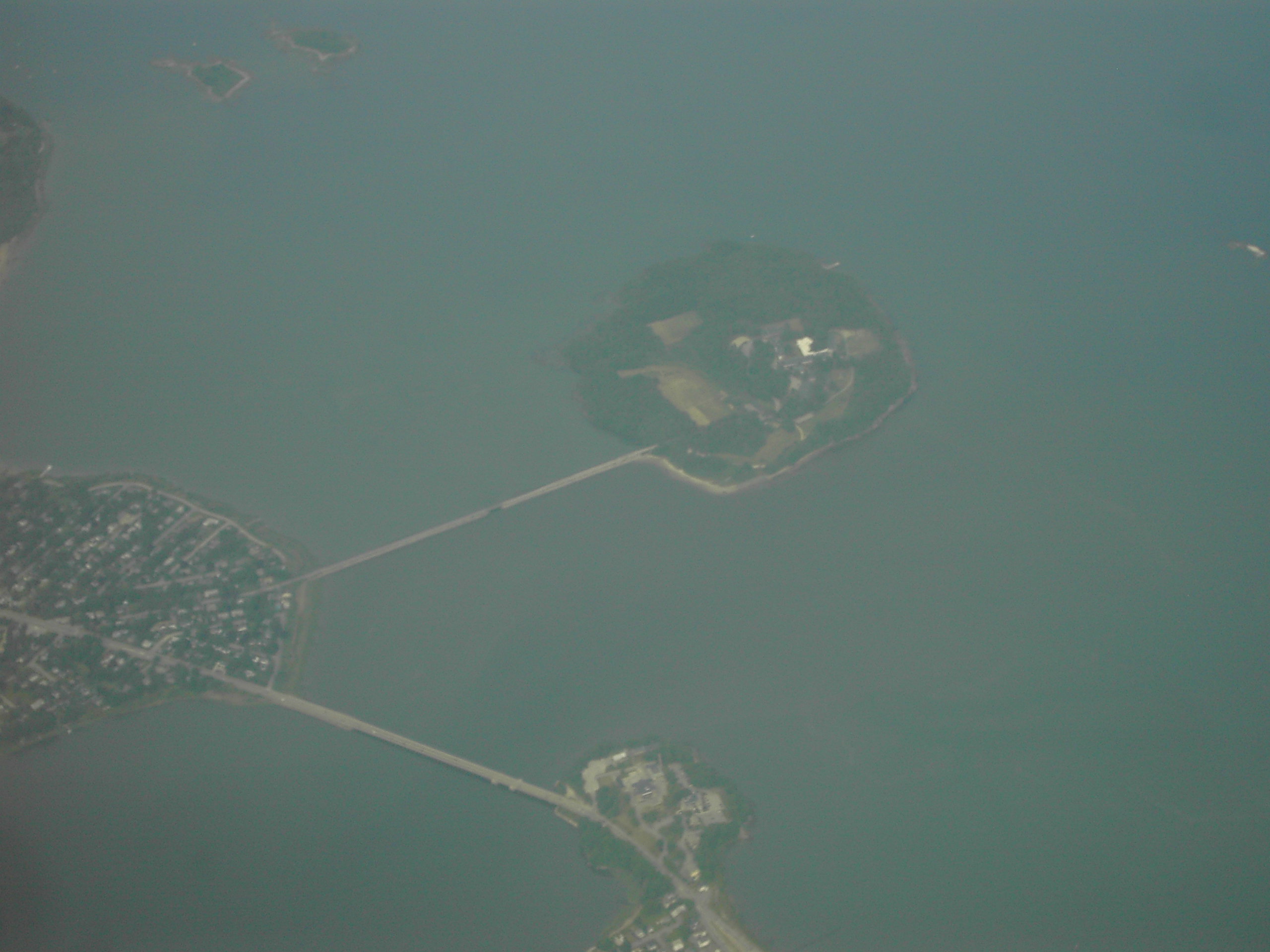
- Aerial view of Mackworth Island

- Location within Maine
- Interactive map of Mackworth Island State Park
- Location: Falmouth, Maine, United States
- Coordinates: 43°41′24″N 70°14′06″W
- Area: 100 acres (40 ha)
- Administrator: Maine Department of Agriculture, Conservation and Forestry
- Website: Official website
- Maine State Parks

Mackworth Island is an approximately 100-acre (40 ha) island in Casco Bay, Maine, United States. Politically, it is part of the town of Falmouth, which is adjacent to Portland. In 1631, Sir Ferdinando Gorges, who first attempted to colonize Maine, gifted the island to Arthur Mackworth, his deputy in Casco Bay, and the island has retained his name. A causeway, which carries the traffic of Andrews Avenue, connects the island to Mackworth Point on the mainland. Visitors to the island must pass a state park entrance tollhouse and pay an entrance fee; cars can enter the island, but parking is limited. There is a footpath around the perimeter of the island with views of Falmouth, Portland, and other islands surrounding the bay. The island is heavily wooded and one portion of those woods is dedicated to "Fairy Houses" which are constructed by visitors using natural materials found on the island. Although most areas of the island are State Park lands, there is a school area that is not open to the public. The island is also home to the Governor Baxter Dog Memorial, a pet cemetery where fourteen of the former governor's Irish Setters and one of his horses were buried, accompanied by two bronze markers and a gravestone, all enclosed by a circular stone wall.

== Governor Baxter School for the Deaf ==
In 1943, Maine's governor Percival P. Baxter deeded the island and causeway, including his summer home, to the State of Maine. In 1957, the state created the Governor Baxter School for the Deaf (formerly known as the Maine School for the Deaf), which continues to operate on the island. The school became infamous in 1981 for a sexual abuse scandal involving the school's principal and superintendent.

== Friends School of Portland ==
Friends School of Portland, an independent Quaker preschool through eighth grade school, was located on Mackworth Island from 2006 to 2015, when it moved to new facility in nearby Cumberland, Maine.

== See also ==
- List of islands of Maine

== Bibliography ==
- Soares, Liz. All for Maine: The Story of Governor Percival P. Baxter. Windswept House Publishers (1996). ISBN 1-883650-17-8
