= Back Cove (Maine) =

- Cove
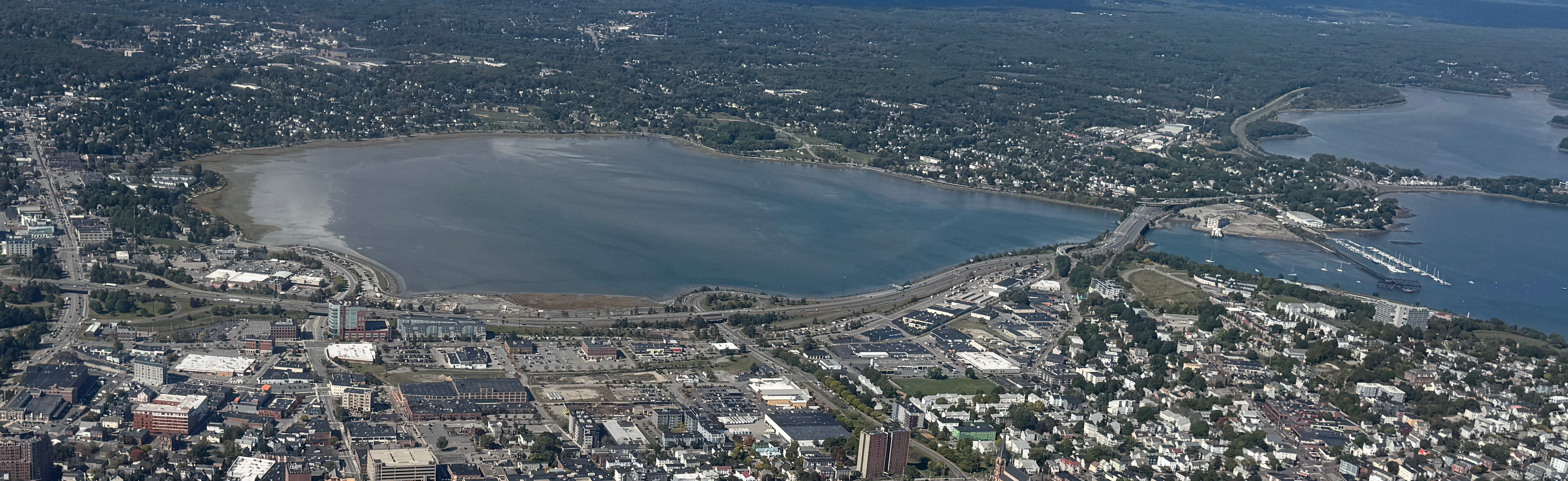
- Aerial view of Back Cove, looking northwest (2024)
- Interactive map of Back Cove
- Coordinates: 43.6723309°N 70.268200°W
- Country: United States
- State: Maine
- County: Cumberland
- Towns: Portland
- Time zone: UTC-5 (Eastern (EST))
  - Summer (DST): UTC-4 (EDT)

Back Cove is an estuary basin on the northern side of the downtown district of Portland, Maine. It is almost circular in form and about 1 mile (1.6 km) in diameter.

Back Cove Trail, a popular loop trail, runs around the circumference of the cove for 3.6 miles (5.8 km).

Being tidal, Back Cove dries out to mud flats at low tide and is not commercially navigable. Its mouth is crossed by Interstate 295 and Tukey's Bridge, which the trail rises up to meet.

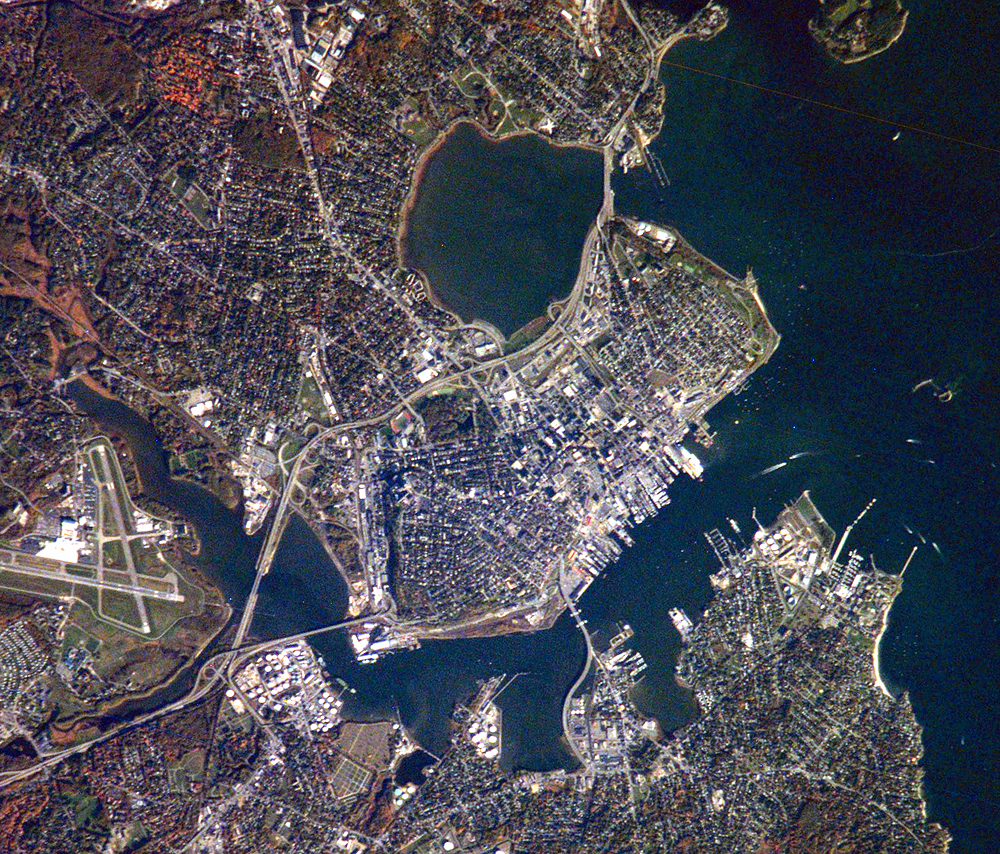
Back Cove (top) as seen in NASA photograph.

== See also ==
- Back Cove South Storage Facility
