= Fore River Sanctuary =

Protected area in Portland, Maine, United States

Coordinates: 43°39′58″N 70°19′01″W

The Fore River Sanctuary is an 85-acre (34 ha) protected area in Portland, Maine. Located in the Stroudwater neighborhood, the sanctuary is home of Jewell Falls, Portland's only natural waterfall and the former home of the Cumberland and Oxford Canal. It also includes a salt water marsh which attracts a number of different species of birds and small mammals. It is named after the nearby Fore River and was protected by the National Audubon Society prior to being given to Portland Trails. The land was donated to Portland Trails by Tom Jewell, one of the founders of Portland Trails, a non-profit urban land trust preserving lands throughout Greater Portland.
