= The Exception Magazine =

Maine local news

- Website type: Online magazine
- Owner: Liberalati LLC
- Website: www.exceptionmag.com
- Commercial: Yes
- Registration: None
- Launched: December 2008
- Current status: Live
- ISSN: 1947-1181

The Exception Magazine is an online news magazine that covers Maine. It is headquartered in Portland, Maine. The Exception Magazine (ISSN 1947-1181), which is updated daily during the week, covers Maine news, business, politics and culture. It is ad-supported and has been available to read free of charge since December 2008.

The Exception introduced a mobile micropayment system on July 15, 2010, which, according to the organization, made it the first online news organization to use such a payment program.

== Editorial stance ==
The Exception Magazine is nonpartisan. It has published guest editorials from conservative groups such as the Maine Heritage Policy Center as well as liberal groups like the Maine Center for Economic Policy. The Exception's publisher is Stefan Deeran.

== Guest contributors ==
Maine Congressman Mike Michaud, Democratic member of Maine Senate and that party's 2010 candidate for the office of Governor of Maine Libby Mitchell, and Maine Governor Paul LePage have contributed to the magazine.

== Hospitality industry coverage ==
The Exception Magazine covers the food and travel industry and is known for its profiles of food tech ceos and town by town restaurant reviews.
