= The Bollard =

Monthly magazine published in Portland, Maine

- Editor: Chris Busby
- Frequency: Monthly
- Founder: Chris Busby
- Founded: 2005
- Company: Bollard Media LLC
- Country: United States
- Based in: Portland, Maine
- Language: English
- Website: thebollard.com

The Bollard (formerly known as Mainer) is a monthly local magazine based in Portland, Maine, covering local news and arts.

== History and profile ==
The Bollard was founded in 2005 with $3000. The first issue of the magazine was published online in September of that year. From 2007 to June 2008, it printed quarterly and thereafter switched to monthly publications. It is a free publication available in public places across southern Maine and online. The magazine is published by Bollard Media LLC, owned by Chris Busby. In 2019, the Bollard was renamed Mainer, however it reverted back to its original name in 2023.

== Editor ==
The Bollard was established by owner/editor-in-chief Chris Busby in 2005 after the collapse of another local paper named the Casco Bay Weekly.
