= Riverside Municipal Golf Course =

Golf course in Portland, Maine

Club information
- Location: 1158 Riverside Street; Portland, ME 04103; United States
- Established: 1932
- Type: Public
- Owner: City of Portland
- Operator: City of Portland
- Total holes: 30
- Website: Official website
- Designed by: Geoffrey Cornish
- Length: 6,406 yards (5,858 m)

Riverside Municipal Golf Course is an 18-hole municipal public golf course owned by the city of Portland, Maine, United States. It is located on the banks of the Presumpscot River.

== History ==
Built as a nine-hold course in 1932, City Manager James E. Barlow officially opened it in July of that year. Each nine-hold round initially cost 50 cents. The course expanded to an 18-holes in 1937 through funding from the Works Progress Administration. In 1969, the nine-hole South Course opened featuring a par 35 playing at 2,941 yards.

From 1938 to 2010, Riverside hosted 42 Maine Open tournaments, the most of any course in the state.

In 2007 the three-hole practice course was built for the use for junior programming. Throughout the winter the course is used for many winter activities, including cross country skiing, sledding, snowboarding, outdoor ice rink and snowshoeing.

Between 2001 and 2012, the course operated at a loss that cost taxpayers almost $200,000.

In 2016, the group Portland Protectors released a report that showed the course spent $25,000 a year on pesticides as part of its campaign to pass an ordinance restricting pesticide use in the city. In response, the course reduced synthetic pesticide use by 60% and installed bee hives. When the City Council passed a pesticide ordinance in 2018 requiring organic landscaping, the golf course was exempted from the requirements if it was designed through Audubon International as a Certified Audubon Cooperative Sanctuary. The course continues to use synthetic pesticides.

The course reopened for the 2020 season with restrictions in place because of the COVID-19 pandemic.
