= Portland, Maine =

Most populous city in Maine, United States

Portland
- City
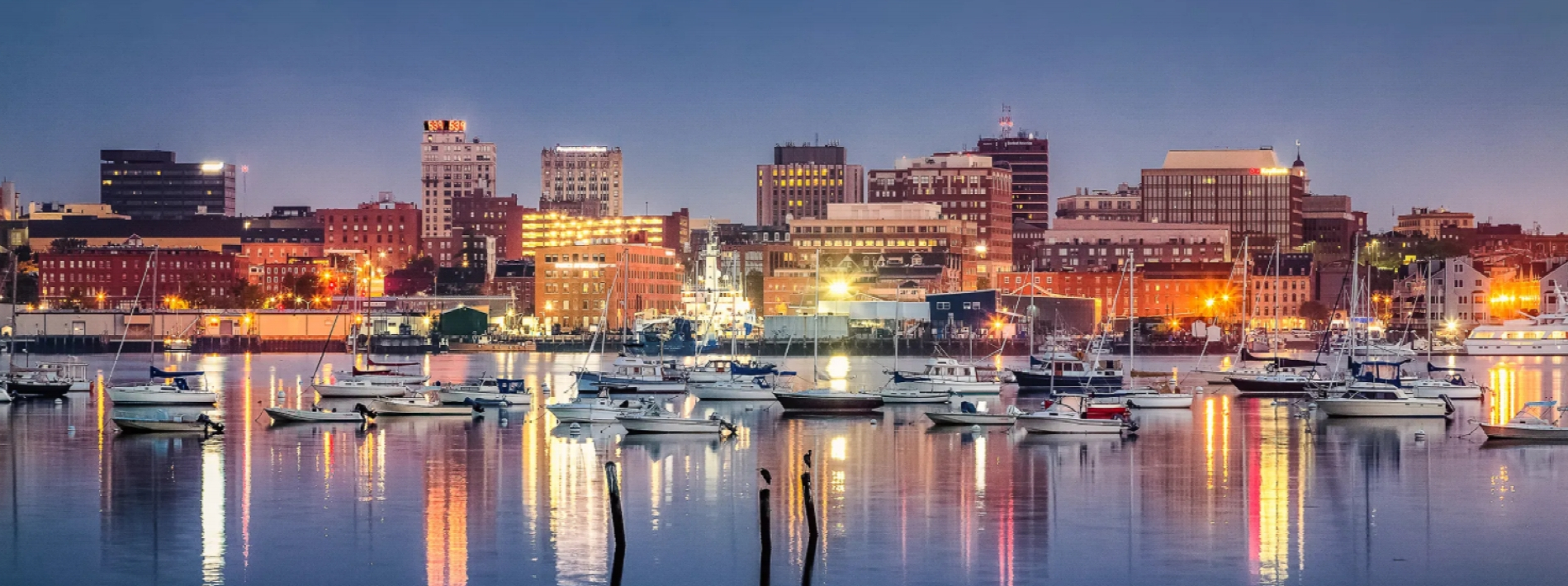
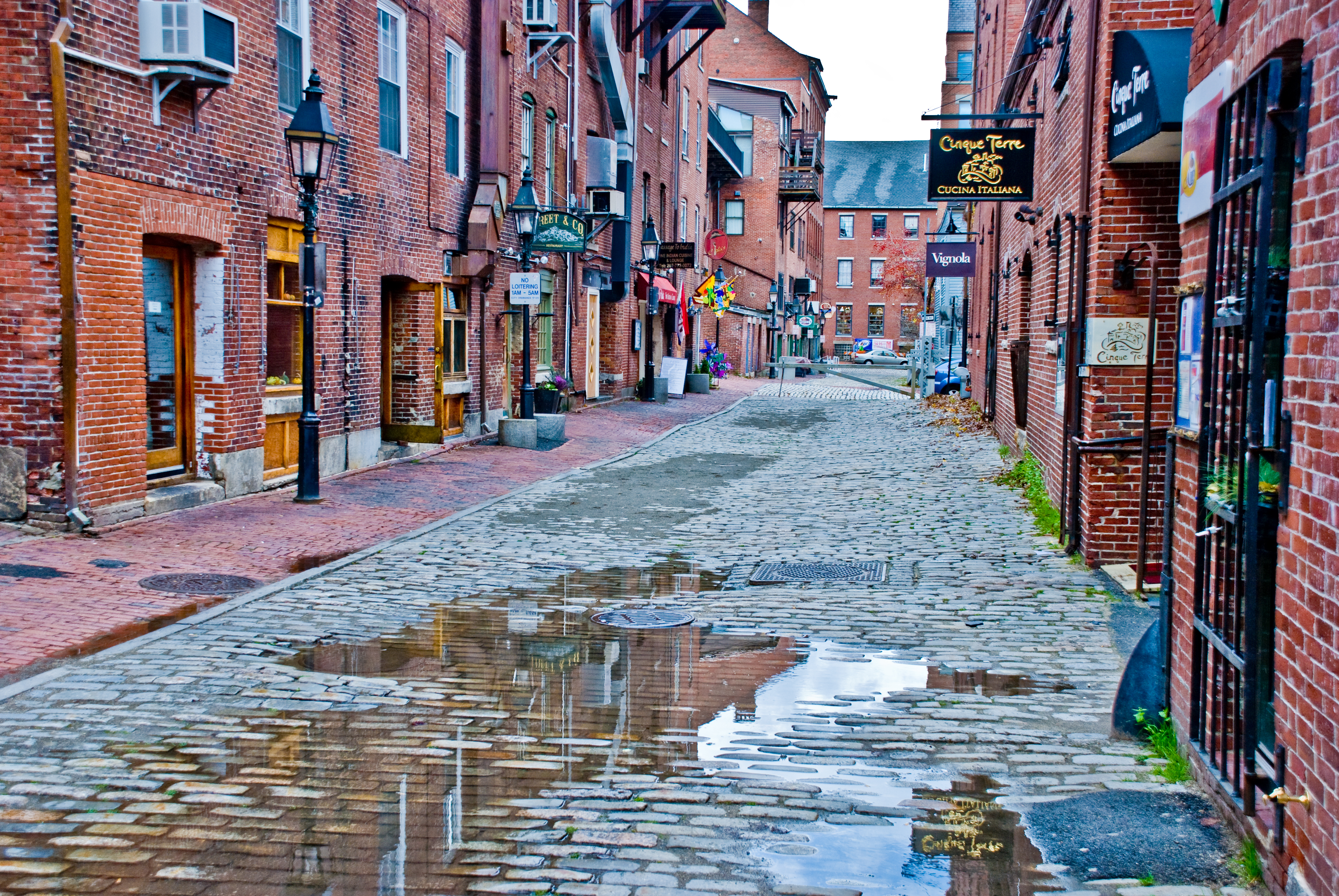
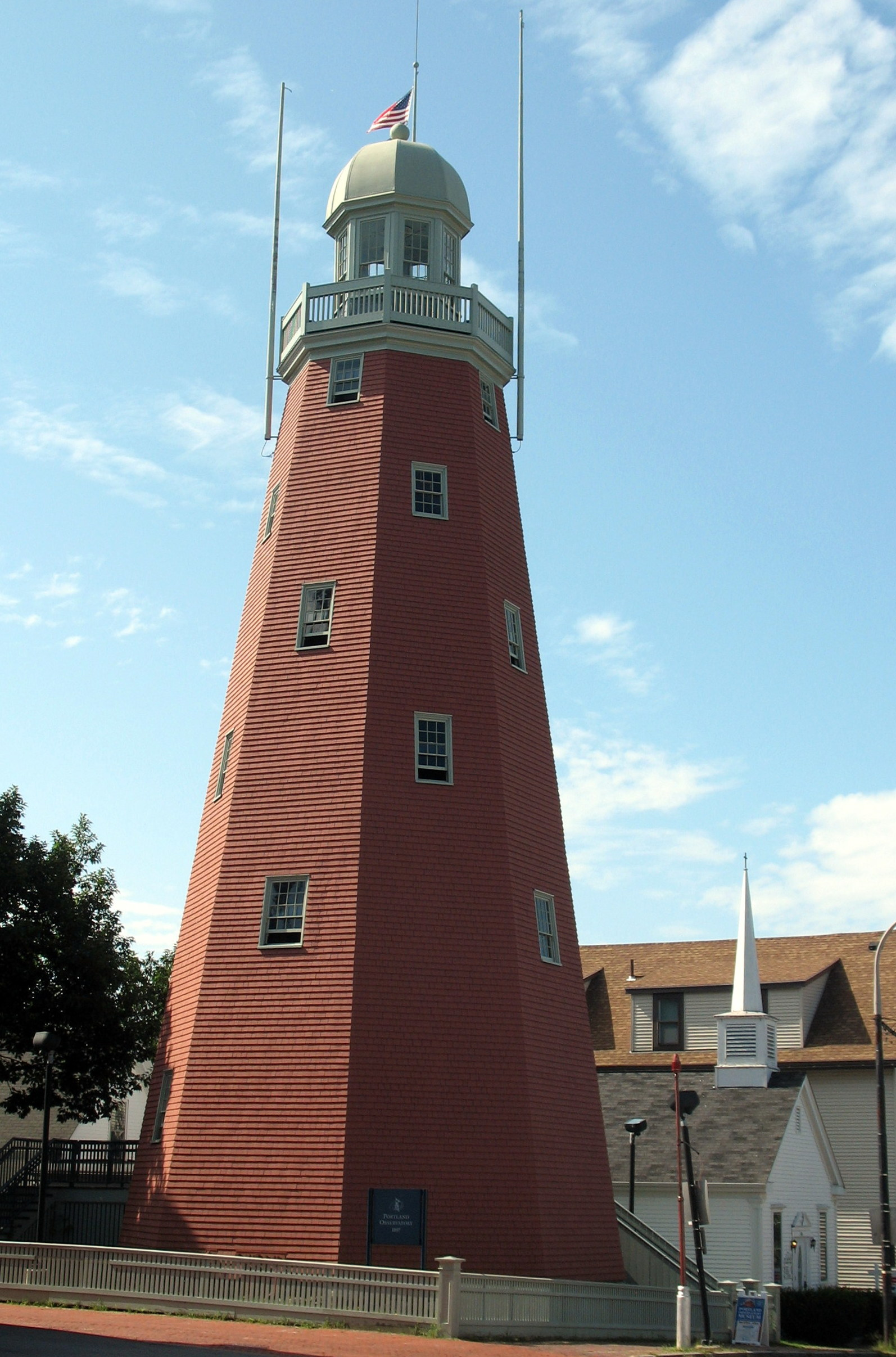
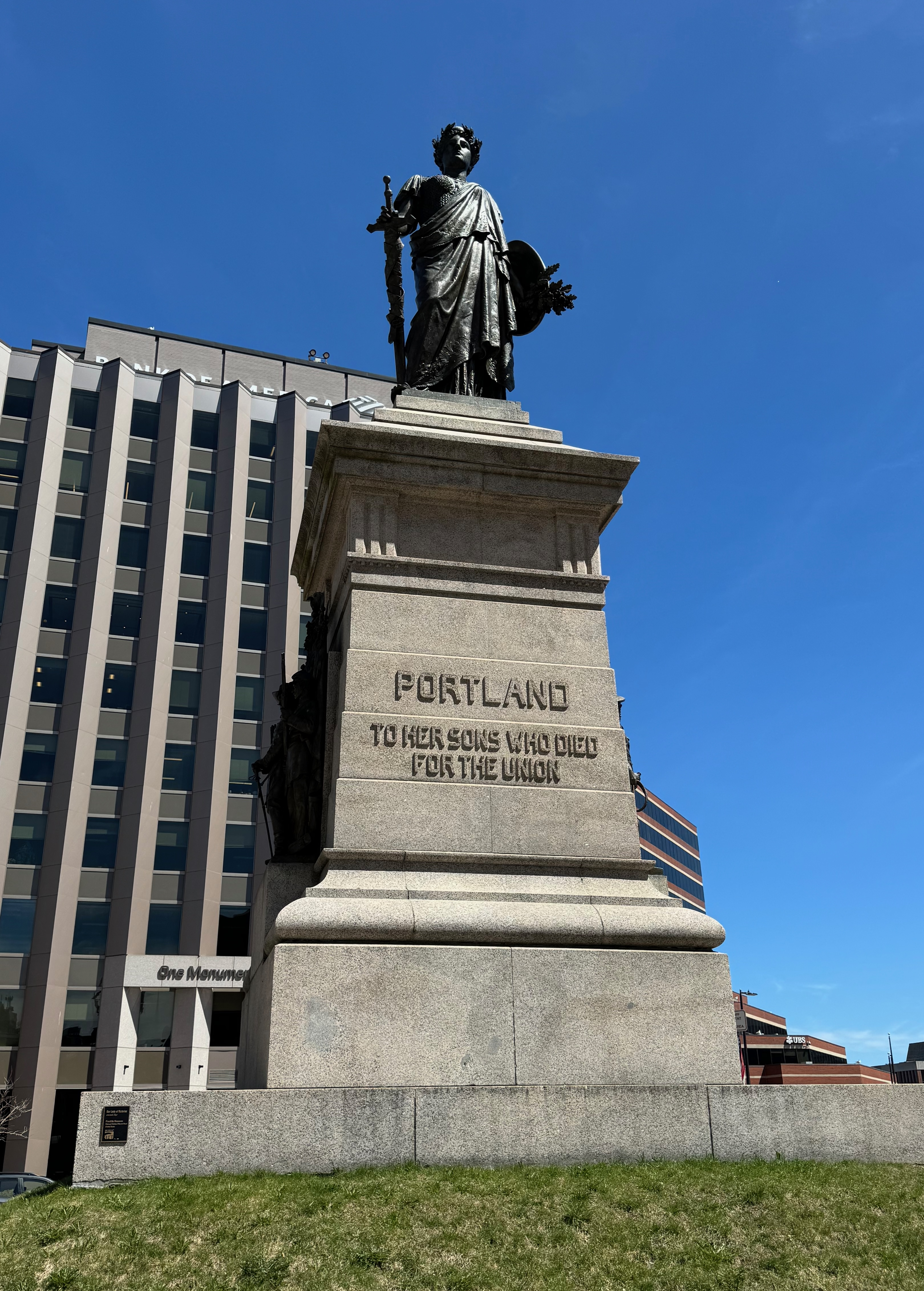
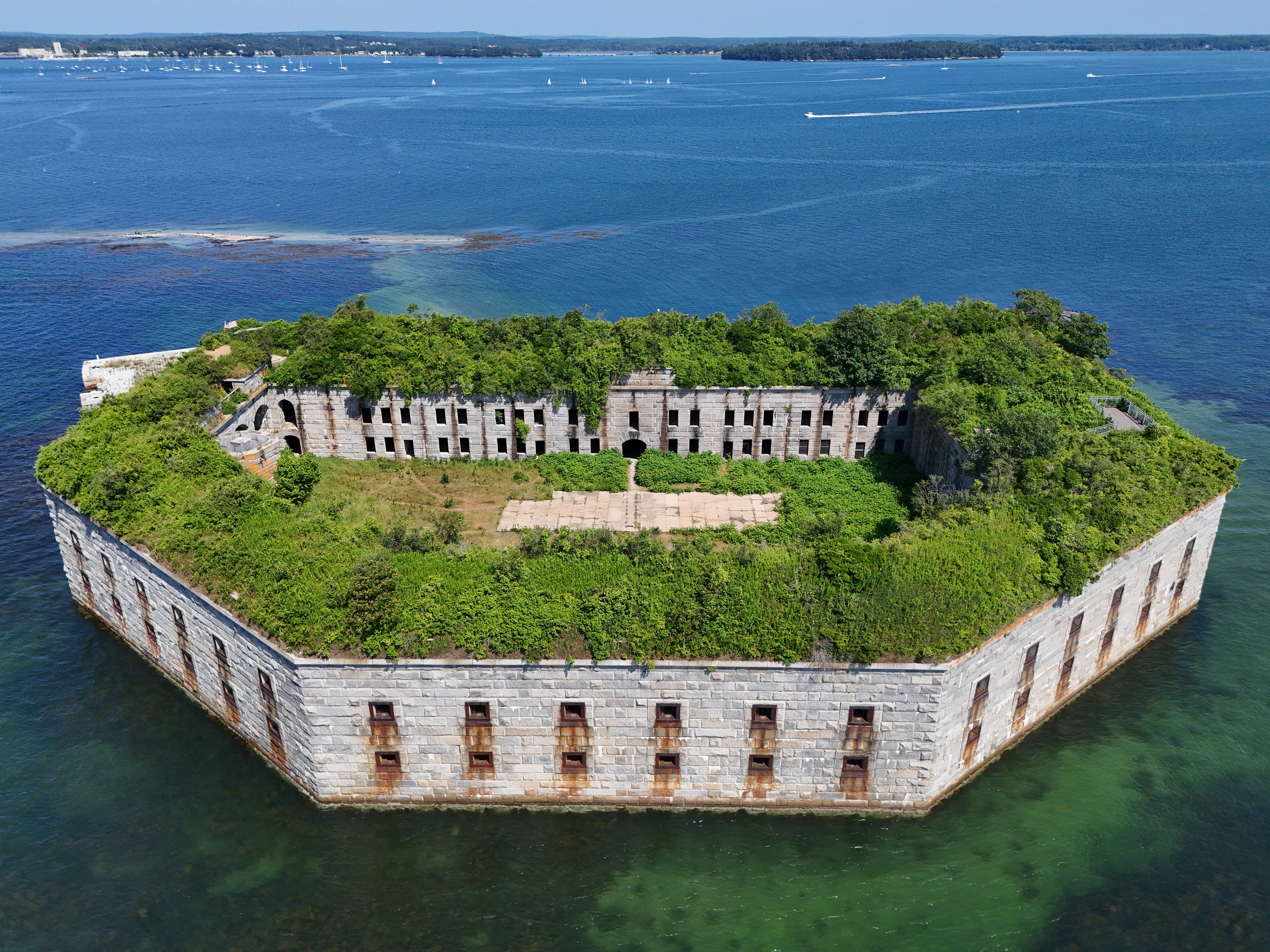
- Portland waterfront Old Port Portland Observatory Monument Square Fort Gorges

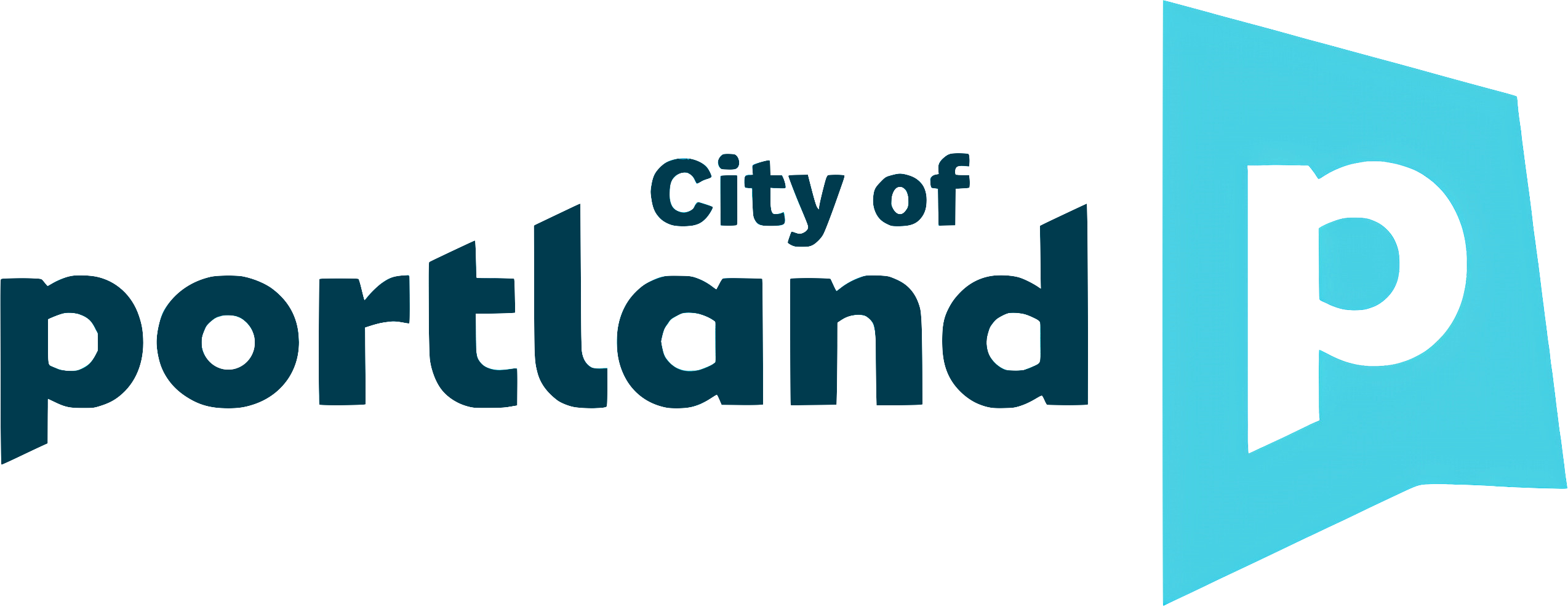
- Flag Logo
- Nickname: The Forest City
- Motto: Resurgam (Latin) "I Will Rise Again"
- Interactive map of Portland
- Location within Maine Location within the United States
- Coordinates: 43°38′50″N 70°10′18″W
- Country: United States
- State: Maine
- County: Cumberland
- Settled: 1632
- Incorporated: July 4, 1786
- Named for: Isle of Portland

Government
  - Type: Council–manager
  - City manager: Danielle West
  - Mayor: Mark Dion (D)
  - Body: Portland City Council

Area
  - City: 69.44 sq mi (179.85 km^{2})
  - Land: 21.54 sq mi (55.79 km^{2})
  - Water: 47.90 sq mi (124.06 km^{2})
  - Urban: 135.91 sq mi (352.0 km^{2})
- Elevation: 62 ft (19 m)

Population (2020)
  - City: 68,408
  - Rank: US: 519th
  - Density: 3,175.9/sq mi (1,226.21/km^{2})
  - Urban: 205,356 (US: 188th)
  - Urban density: 1,657.7/sq mi (640.0/km^{2})
  - Metro: 556,893 (US: 103rd)
- Demonym: Portlander
- Time zone: UTC−5 (EST)
  - Summer (DST): UTC−4 (EDT)
- ZIP Codes: 04101–04104, 04108–04109, 04112, 04116, 04122–04124
- Area code: 207
- FIPS code: 23-60545
- GNIS feature ID: 582683
- Website: www.portlandmaine.gov

Portland is the most populous city in the U.S. state of Maine. Its population was 68,408 at the 2020 census and the Greater Portland metropolitan area has a population of approximately 550,000 people, the most populous metropolitan area in Maine. It is the county seat of Cumberland County. Historically tied to commercial shipping, the marine economy, and light industry, Portland's economy in the 21st century relies mostly on the service sector. The Port of Portland is the second-largest tonnage seaport in the New England area as of 2019.

First settled in the early 1600s as part of the Massachusetts Bay Colony, the city endured multiple attacks during colonial conflicts before emerging as a key port in New England. It was formally founded in 1786 and named after the English Isle of Portland. In turn, the city of Portland, Oregon, was named after Portland, Maine. The city seal depicts a phoenix rising from ashes, a reference to Portland's recovery from four devastating fires.

Notable Portland landmarks include the historic Old Port district, known for its cobblestone streets and preserved warehouses; Victoria Mansion, an ornate Italianate home reflecting the city's prosperity during the pre-Civil War era; and the Portland Museum of Art, the largest and oldest public art institution in the state. The Greater Portland area has emerged as an important center for the creative economy, which is also bringing gentrification.

== History ==
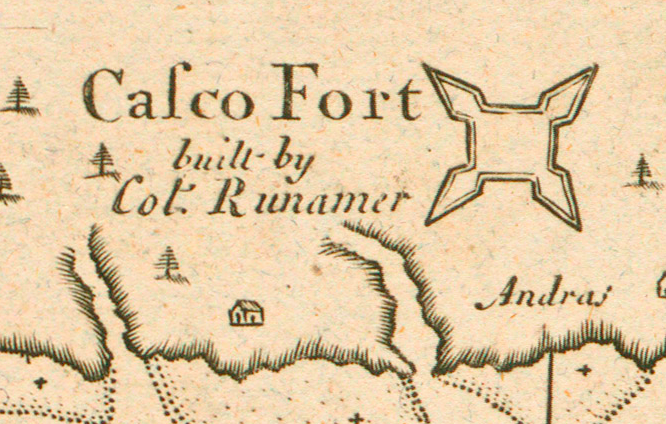
Fort Casco, Portland, Maine, built by Wolfgang William Romer; map by Cyprian Southack

The original Algonquin-speaking Eastern Abenaki residents called the Portland peninsula Machigonne ("great neck"). It is also called Məkíhkanək ("at the fish hook") in Penobscot.

The first European settler was Christopher Levett, an English naval captain granted 6,000 acres (9.4 sq mi; 2,400 ha) in 1623 to found a settlement in Casco Bay. A member of the Council for New England and agent for Ferdinando Gorges, Levett built a stone house where he left a company of ten men, then returned to England to write a book about his voyage to bolster support for the settlement. Ultimately, the settlement was a failure and the fate of Levett's colonists is unknown. The explorer sailed from England to the Massachusetts Bay Colony to meet John Winthrop in 1630, but never returned to Maine. Fort Levett in the harbor is named for him.

The peninsula was settled in 1632 as a fishing and trading village named Casco. When the Massachusetts Bay Colony took over Casco Bay in 1658, the town's name changed again to Falmouth. In 1676, the village was destroyed by the Abenaki during King Philip's War. It was rebuilt. During King William's War, a raiding party of French and their native allies attacked and largely destroyed it again in the Battle of Fort Loyal (1690).

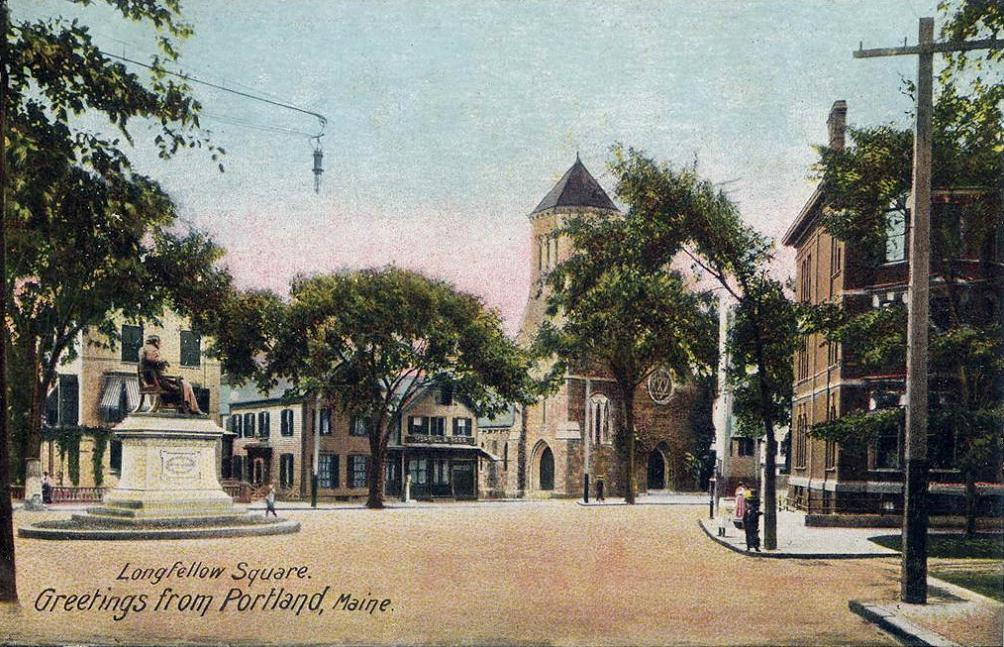
Longfellow Square (c. 1906)

On October 18, 1775, Falmouth was burned in the Revolution by the Royal Navy under command of Captain Henry Mowat. Following the war, a section of Falmouth called The Neck developed as a commercial port and began to grow rapidly as a shipping center. In 1786, the citizens of Falmouth formed a separate town in Falmouth Neck and named it Portland, after the Isle of Portland off the coast of Dorset, England. The word Portland is derived from the Old English word Portlanda, which means "land surrounding a harbor".

Portland's economy was greatly stressed by the Embargo Act of 1807 (prohibition of trade with the British), which ended in 1809, and the War of 1812, which ended in 1815. In 1820, Maine was established as a state with Portland as its capital. In 1832, the capital was moved north and east to Augusta. In 1851, Maine led the nation by passing the first state law prohibiting the sale of alcohol except for "medicinal, mechanical or manufacturing purposes." The law subsequently became known as the Maine law, as eighteen other states quickly followed. The Portland Rum Riot occurred on June 2, 1855.

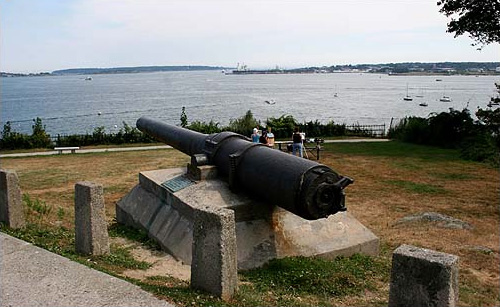
Gun recovered from USS Maine on Munjoy Hill

In 1853, upon completion of the Grand Trunk Railway to Montreal, Portland became the primary ice-free winter seaport for Canadian exports. The Portland Company, located on Fore Street, manufactured more than six hundred 19th-century steam locomotives, as well as engines for trains and boats, fire engines and other railroad transportation equipment. The Portland Company was, for a time, the city's largest employer and many of its employees were immigrants from Canada, Ireland and Italy. Portland became a 20th-century rail hub as five additional rail lines merged into Portland Terminal Company in 1911. These rail lines also facilitated movement of returning Canadian troops from the First World War in 1919. Following nationalization of the Grand Trunk system in 1923, Canadian export traffic was diverted from Portland to Halifax, resulting in marked local economic decline. Icebreakers later enabled ships to reach Montreal in winter, drastically reducing Portland's role as a winter port for Canada.

On June 26, 1863, a Confederate raiding party led by Captain Charles Read entered the harbor at Portland leading to the Battle of Portland Harbor, one of the northernmost battles of the Civil War. The 1866 Great Fire of Portland, Maine, on July 4, 1866, ignited during the Independence Day celebration, destroyed most of the commercial buildings in the city, half the churches and hundreds of homes. More than 10,000 people were left homeless.

By act of the Maine Legislature in 1899, Portland annexed the city of Deering, despite a vote by Deering residents rejecting the motion, thereby greatly increasing the size of the city and opening areas for development beyond the peninsula.

In 1967, the city began the controversial razing of Franklin Street to construct a limited-access highway to improve access in and out of the city for non-residents. The reconstruction of the street demolished 130 homes and businesses and caused an unknown number of families to be relocated or displaced. The construction of The Maine Mall, an indoor shopping center established in South Portland in 1971, economically depressed downtown Portland. The trend reversed when tourists and new businesses started revitalizing the old seaport, a part of which is known locally as the Old Port.

Since the 1990s, the historically industrial Bayside neighborhood has seen rapid development, including attracting a Whole Foods Market and Trader Joe's grocery stores, as well as Baxter Academy for Technology and Science, a charter school. Other developing neighborhoods include the India Street neighborhood, near the Ocean Gateway, and Munjoy Hill, where many modern condominiums have been built. The Maine College of Art has been a revitalizing force downtown, attracting students from around the country. The historic Porteous Building on Congress Street was restored by the college. Universities operating in the city are expanding. The University of Southern Maine is improving its Portland campus with a 580-bed dormitory, student center, and an arts center. The University of New England intends to move its medical school from its Biddeford campus to its Portland campus. Northeastern University's Roux Institute plans to build on the former B&M Baked Beans factory campus in East Deering.

Portland is known as a walkable city, offering many opportunities for walking tours which feature its maritime and architectural history.

== Geography ==
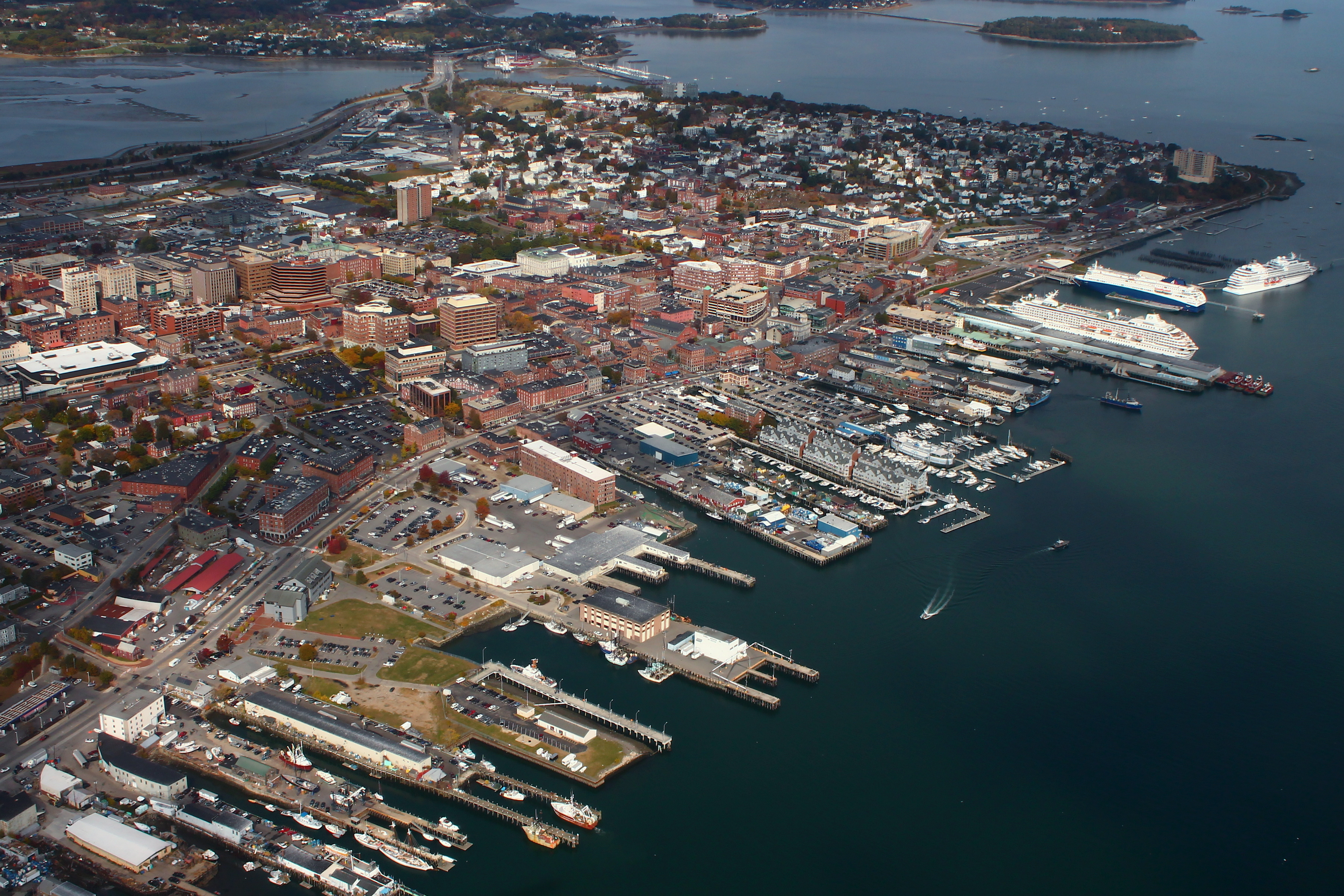
Aerial view of the Portland peninsula, looking northeast

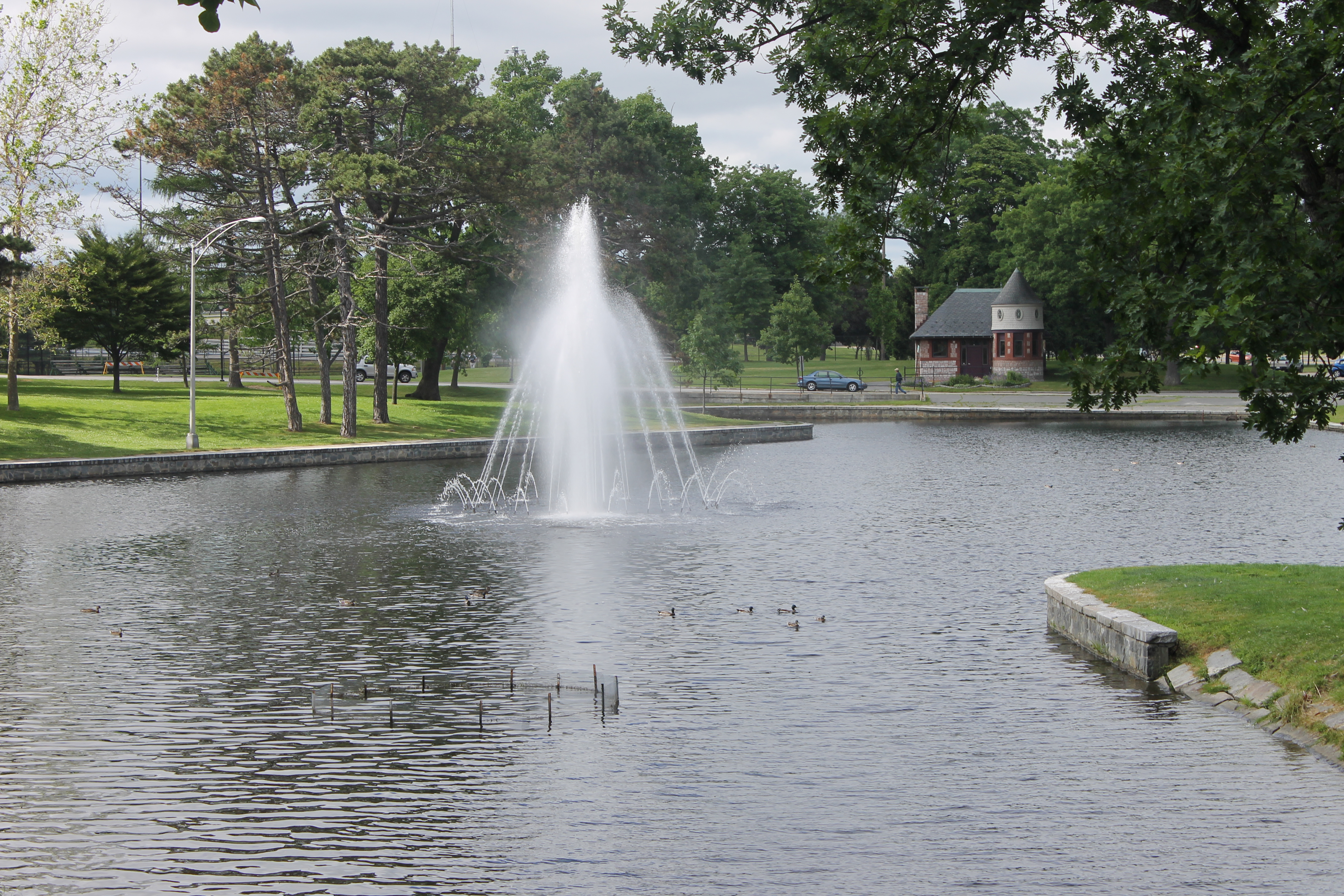
Deering Oaks Park with fountain and castle pavilion is located at the point where Interstate 295 meets State Street, Park Avenue, and Deering Avenue.

According to the United States Census Bureau, the city has a total area of 69.44 sq mi (179.85 km^{2}), of which 21.31 sq mi (55.19 km^{2}) is land and 48.13 sq mi (124.66 km^{2}) is water. Portland is situated on a peninsula in Casco Bay on the Gulf of Maine and the Atlantic Ocean.

Portland borders South Portland, Westbrook and Falmouth.

=== Climate ===
Portland has a humid continental climate (Köppen: Dfb), with cold, snowy, and often prolonged winters, and warm to hot, yet relatively short summers. The monthly average high temperature ranges from roughly 30 °F (−1 °C) in January to around 80 °F (27 °C) in July. Daily high temperatures reach or exceed 90 °F (32 °C) on only four days per year on average, while cold-season lows of 0 °F (−18 °C) or below are reached on 10 nights per year on average. The area can be affected by severe nor'easters during winter, with high winds and snowfall totals often measuring over a foot. Annual rainfall averages 47.2 in (1,200 mm) and is plentiful year-round, but with a slightly drier summer. Annual frozen precipitation (snow) averages 69 in (175 cm) in the city. However, this number can fluctuate seasonally from as little as 30 inches to as much as 150 inches, depending on a multitude of factors. In Southern Maine, snowstorms can be intense from November through early April, while warm-season thunderstorms are somewhat less frequent than in the Midwestern, Mid-Atlantic, and Southeastern U.S. (although their frequency has increased in recent years). Direct strikes by hurricanes or tropical storms are rare, partially due to the normally cooler Atlantic waters off the Maine coast (which usually weaken tropical systems), but primarily because most tropical systems approaching or reaching 40 degrees North latitude recurve (due to the Coriolis force) and track east out to sea well south of the Portland area. Extreme temperatures range from −39 °F (−39 °C) on February 16, 1943, to 103 °F (39 °C) on July 4, 1911, and August 2, 1975. The hardiness zones are 5b and 6a.

Climate data for Portland International Jetport, Maine (1991–2020 normals, (Note: Mean monthly maxima and minima (i.e. the expected highest and lowest temperature readings at any point during the year or given month) calculated based on data at said location from 1991 to 2020.) extremes 1871–present (Note: Official records for Portland were kept at downtown from March 1871 to 24 November 1940, and at Portland Int'l Jetport (PWM) since 25 November 1940. Temperature records are limited to the period that PWM was the official site (i.e. since 1940) and are based on the Monthly Weather Summary product issued by the NWS office in Gray, Maine. precipitation and snowfall records date to 1871 and 1882, respectively.))
Month	Jan	Feb	Mar	Apr	May	Jun	Jul	Aug	Sep	Oct	Nov	Dec	Year
Record high °F (°C)	67 (19)	68 (20)	88 (31)	92 (33)	96 (36)	99 (37)	103 (39)	103 (39)	96 (36)	88 (31)	79 (26)	71 (22)	103 (39)
Mean maximum °F (°C)	51.8 (11.0)	51.5 (10.8)	61.2 (16.2)	74.5 (23.6)	85.4 (29.7)	89.2 (31.8)	91.6 (33.1)	90.0 (32.2)	86.6 (30.3)	75.3 (24.1)	65.4 (18.6)	55.6 (13.1)	93.5 (34.2)
Mean daily maximum °F (°C)	32.4 (0.2)	35.0 (1.7)	42.3 (5.7)	53.8 (12.1)	64.2 (17.9)	73.6 (23.1)	79.5 (26.4)	78.7 (25.9)	71.1 (21.7)	59.5 (15.3)	48.4 (9.1)	38.3 (3.5)	56.4 (13.6)
Daily mean °F (°C)	24.0 (−4.4)	26.2 (−3.2)	34.1 (1.2)	44.6 (7.0)	54.9 (12.7)	64.3 (17.9)	70.4 (21.3)	69.2 (20.7)	61.6 (16.4)	50.3 (10.2)	40.0 (4.4)	30.3 (−0.9)	47.5 (8.6)
Mean daily minimum °F (°C)	15.6 (−9.1)	17.3 (−8.2)	26.0 (−3.3)	35.4 (1.9)	45.5 (7.5)	55.0 (12.8)	61.2 (16.2)	59.7 (15.4)	52.1 (11.2)	41.0 (5.0)	31.7 (−0.2)	22.4 (−5.3)	38.6 (3.7)
Mean minimum °F (°C)	−6.1 (−21.2)	−2.2 (−19.0)	6.4 (−14.2)	23.7 (−4.6)	33.1 (0.6)	43.4 (6.3)	51.7 (10.9)	48.6 (9.2)	37.1 (2.8)	26.5 (−3.1)	16.0 (−8.9)	3.9 (−15.6)	−9.0 (−22.8)
Record low °F (°C)	−26 (−32)	−39 (−39)	−21 (−29)	8 (−13)	23 (−5)	33 (1)	40 (4)	33 (1)	23 (−5)	15 (−9)	−6 (−21)	−21 (−29)	−39 (−39)
Average precipitation inches (mm)	3.50 (89)	3.54 (90)	4.08 (104)	4.41 (112)	3.67 (93)	4.15 (105)	3.43 (87)	3.57 (91)	3.77 (96)	5.25 (133)	4.25 (108)	4.50 (114)	48.12 (1,222)
Average snowfall inches (cm)	18.6 (47)	16.6 (42)	13.6 (35)	2.8 (7.1)	0.0 (0.0)	0.0 (0.0)	0.0 (0.0)	0.0 (0.0)	0.0 (0.0)	0.2 (0.51)	2.3 (5.8)	14.6 (37)	68.7 (174)
Average extreme snow depth inches (cm)	11.5 (29)	11.5 (29)	11.9 (30)	2.3 (5.8)	0.0 (0.0)	0.0 (0.0)	0.0 (0.0)	0.0 (0.0)	0.0 (0.0)	0.1 (0.25)	1.3 (3.3)	8.2 (21)	17.6 (45)
Average precipitation days (≥ 0.01 in)	11.2	10.2	11.3	11.1	12.5	11.7	10.8	9.4	9.3	10.9	10.7	12.3	131.4
Average snowy days (≥ 0.1 in)	7.6	7.0	5.1	1.3	0.0	0.0	0.0	0.0	0.0	0.1	1.5	6.0	28.6
Average relative humidity (%)	66.8	65.2	66.3	66.8	71.1	74.7	75.3	76.3	76.7	73.9	72.6	70.2	71.3
Average dew point °F (°C)	11.5 (−11.4)	12.9 (−10.6)	21.7 (−5.7)	30.9 (−0.6)	42.6 (5.9)	53.1 (11.7)	59.2 (15.1)	58.5 (14.7)	50.9 (10.5)	39.7 (4.3)	30.0 (−1.1)	17.4 (−8.1)	35.7 (2.1)
Mean monthly sunshine hours	164.8	172.8	205.2	213.5	243.2	259.1	282.2	267.6	229.1	195.7	138.7	140.9	2,512.8
Percentage possible sunshine	57	59	55	53	53	56	60	62	61	57	48	51	56
Average ultraviolet index	1	2	3	5	7	8	8	7	5	3	2	1	4
Source 1: NOAA (relative humidity and sun 1961–1990)
Source 2: Weather Atlas (UV)

Water temperatures
Month	Jan	Feb	Mar	Apr	May	Jun	Jul	Aug	Sep	Oct	Nov	Dec	Year
Average sea temperature °F (°C)	41.3 (5.2)	38.8 (3.8)	38.0 (3.3)	41.6 (5.3)	46.7 (8.1)	54.6 (12.6)	61.3 (16.3)	63.7 (17.7)	60.5 (15.8)	54.9 (12.8)	49.6 (9.8)	45.3 (7.4)	49.7 (9.8)
Source: Weather Atlas

=== Sea-level rise ===
Portland is becoming increasingly affected by global warming and the rise of sea levels. The coast is one of the fastest-warming saltwater bodies, and is predicted to see an increase to about 10–17 inches by 2030, in comparison to the levels in 2000. This is a major threat to the residents and ocean life around the area. In 2022, the National Oceanic and Atmospheric Administration issued a report that showed sea level in Portland could rise by six inches by 2050, two feet by 2060 and two to six feet by 2100.

In January 2024, Portland experienced a record-high tide of 14.57 feet (4.44 m). Combined with heavy rainfall and strong winds, it caused severe flooding.

=== Neighborhoods ===
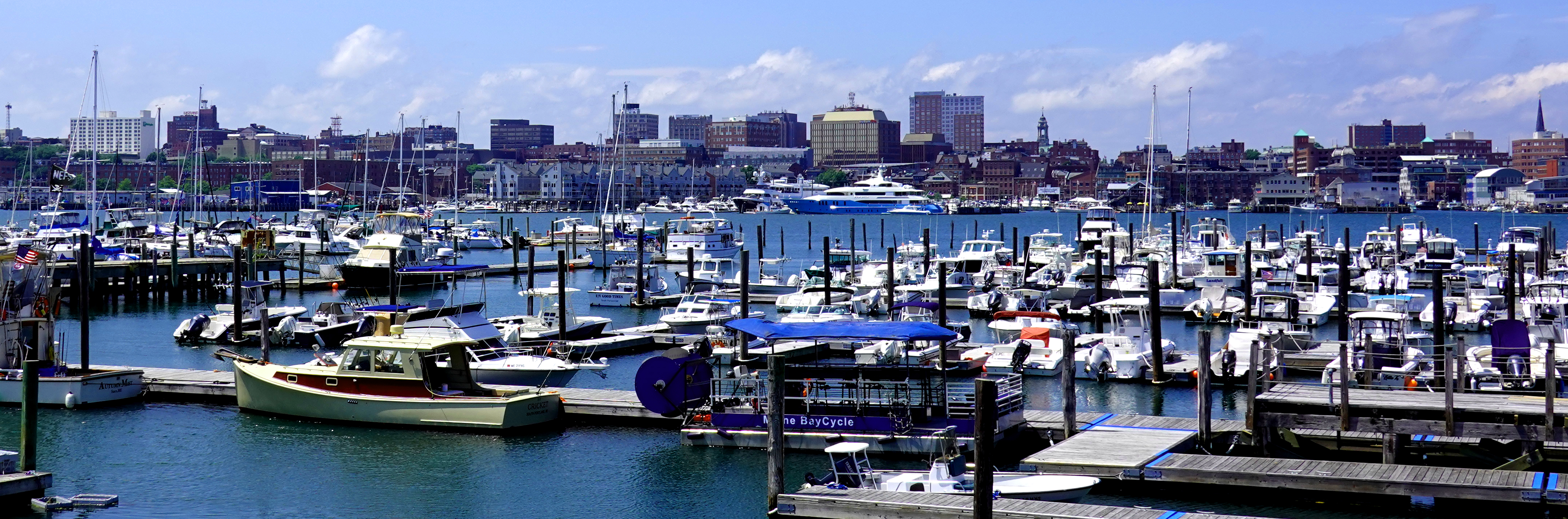
Portland waterfront looking west

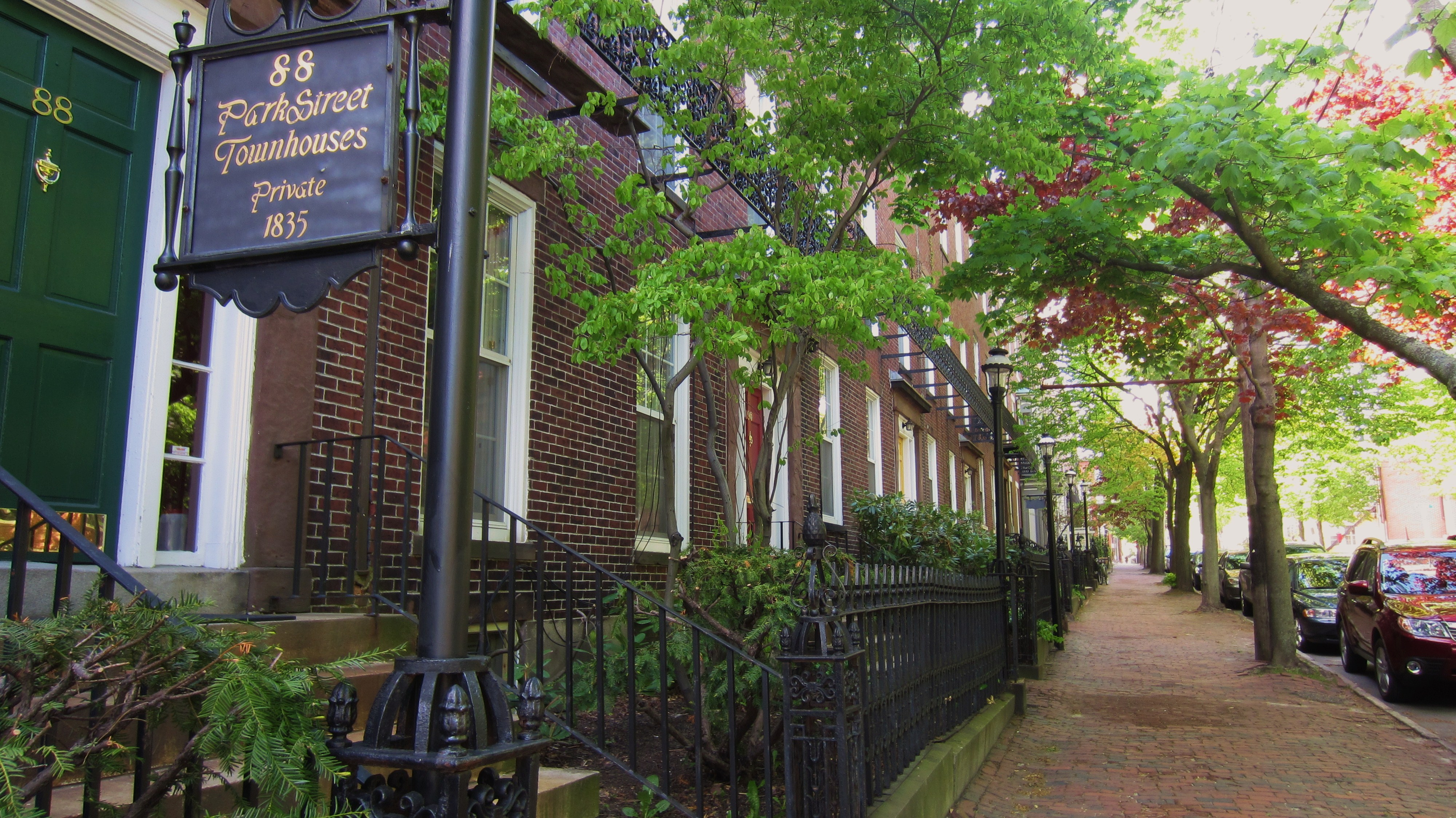
Park Street Row in the West End, completed 1835

Portland is organized into neighborhoods generally recognized by residents, but they have no legal or political authority. In many cases, city signs identify neighborhoods or intersections (which are often called corners). Most city neighborhoods have a local association which usually maintains ongoing relations of varying degrees with the city government on issues affecting the neighborhood.

On March 8, 1899, Portland annexed the neighboring city of Deering. Deering neighborhoods now comprise the northern and eastern sections of the city before the merger. Portland's Deering High School was formerly the public high school for Deering.

Portland's neighborhoods include the Arts District, Bayside, Bradley's Corner, Cliff Island, Cushing Island, Deering Center, Deering Highlands, Downtown, East Deering, East Bayside, East End, Eastern Cemetery, Great Diamond Island, Highlands, Kennedy Park, Libbytown, Little Diamond Island, Lunt's Corner, Morrill's Corner, Munjoy Hill, Nason's Corner, North Deering, Oakdale, the Old Port, Parkside, Peaks Island, Riverton Park, Rosemont, Stroudwater, West End, and Woodfords Corner.

From the early 2000s onward, many of Portland's neighborhoods have faced gentrification, causing many local residents to be "priced out" of their neighborhoods. In 2015, the Portland Press Herald published a series of articles documenting the "super-tight apartment market" and the trauma caused by evictions and steep jumps in monthly rent. Also in that year, city landlords raised rents by an average of 17.4%, which was the second-largest jump in the country.

== Demographics ==
Historical population
Census	Pop.	Note	%±
1790	2,240		—
1800	3,704		65.4%
1810	7,169		93.5%
1820	8,581		19.7%
1830	12,598		46.8%
1840	15,218		20.8%
1850	20,815		36.8%
1860	26,341		26.5%
1870	31,413		19.3%
1880	33,810		7.6%
1890	36,425		7.7%
1900	50,145		37.7%
1910	58,571		16.8%
1920	69,272		18.3%
1930	70,810		2.2%
1940	73,643		4.0%
1950	77,634		5.4%
1960	72,566		−6.5%
1970	65,116		−10.3%
1980	61,572		−5.4%
1990	64,358		4.5%
2000	64,249		−0.2%
2010	66,194		3.0%
2020	68,408		3.3%
2024 (est.)	69,568		1.7%
U.S. Decennial Census Raymond H. Fogler Library

=== Racial and ethnic composition ===
Race and ethnicity composition of Portland, Maine

Race/ethnicity	2020	2010	2000	1990	1960
White	84.6%	83.6%	91.27%	96%	99.4%
African Americans	8.4%	7.1%	2.59%	1.1%	0.5%
Asian	3.5%	3.5%	3.08%	1.7%	0.1%
Two or more races	2.9%	2.7%	1.86%	0.2%	NA
Hispanic or Latino	3%	3%	1.52%	0.8%	NA
Native American	0.1%	0.5%	0.47%	0.4%	NA

In 2010, the racial and ethnic makeup of the city was 85.0% White (83.6% non-Hispanic White alone), down from 96.6% in 1990, 7.1% African American, 0.5% Native American, 3.5% Asian, 1.2% from other races, and 2.7% from two or more races. Hispanic or Latino of any race were 3.0% of the population. 40.7% of the population had a bachelor's degree or higher. In 2020, the racial and ethnic makeup of the city remained predominantly non-Hispanic white.

=== 2020 census ===
As of the 2020 census, Portland had a population of 68,408. The median age was 37.6 years. 15.4% of residents were under the age of 18 and 16.4% of residents were 65 years of age or older. For every 100 females there were 94.2 males, and for every 100 females age 18 and over there were 92.1 males age 18 and over.

98.4% of residents lived in urban areas, while 1.6% lived in rural areas.

There were 32,400 households in Portland, of which 18.2% had children under the age of 18 living in them. Of all households, 31.5% were married-couple households, 24.4% were households with a male householder and no spouse or partner present, and 33.5% were households with a female householder and no spouse or partner present. About 40.4% of all households were made up of individuals and 12.8% had someone living alone who was 65 years of age or older.

There were 35,747 housing units, of which 9.4% were vacant. The homeowner vacancy rate was 0.6% and the rental vacancy rate was 4.1%.

Racial composition as of the 2020 census
Race	Number	Percent
White	54,025	79.0%
Black or African American	6,995	10.2%
American Indian and Alaska Native	208	0.3%
Asian	2,205	3.2%
Native Hawaiian and Other Pacific Islander	27	0.0%
Some other race	1,118	1.6%
Two or more races	3,830	5.6%
Hispanic or Latino (of any race)	2,639	3.9%

=== 2010 census ===
As of the census of 2010, there were 66,194 people, 30,725 households, and 13,324 families residing in the city. The population density was 3,106.2/sq mi (1,199.3/km^{2}). There were 33,836 housing units at an average density of 1,587.8/sq mi (613.1/km^{2}), with homeownership rates at approximately 45%.

In 2010, there were 30,725 households, of which 20.7% had children under the age of 18 living with them, 29.7% were married couples living together, 10.1% had a female householder with no husband present, 3.6% had a male householder with no wife present, and 56.6% were non-families. 40.5% of all households were made up of individuals, and 11.4% had someone living alone who was 65 years of age or older. The average household size was 2.07 and the average family size was 2.88.

The median age in the city was 36.7 years. 17.1% of residents were under the age of 18; 11.4% were between the ages of 18 and 24; 33.1% were from 25 to 44; 25.9% were from 45 to 64; and 12.6% were 65 years of age or older. The gender makeup of the city was 48.8% male and 51.2% female.

=== 2000 census ===
In 2000, according to the U.S. Census Bureau, Portland's immediate metropolitan area ranked 147th in the nation with a population of 243,537, while the Portland/South Portland/Biddeford metropolitan area included 487,568 total inhabitants. This increased to an estimated 513,102 inhabitants as of 2007. Much of this increase in population has been due to growth in the city's southern and western suburbs.

In 2000, the median income for a household in the city was $35,650, and the median income for a family was $48,763. Males had a median income of $31,828 versus $27,173 for females. The per capita income for the city was $22,698. About 9.7% of families and 14.1% of the population were below the poverty line, including 12.5% of those under age 18 and 11.9% of those age 65 or over.

=== Households and income ===
Portland has experienced significant housing affordability challenges since the early 2000s. From the early 2000s onward, many of Portland's neighborhoods have faced gentrification, causing many local residents to be "priced out" of their neighborhoods. In 2015, city landlords raised rents by an average of 17.4%, which was the second-largest jump in the country.

In November 2020, Portland voters approved the "Green New Deal" referendum, which included inclusionary zoning requirements mandating that developments of 10 or more units include 25% affordable housing units. Voters also approved a rent control ordinance that initially froze rents and subsequently limited annual rent increases. In 2022, voters further strengthened tenant protections by reducing allowable rent increases to 70% of the Consumer Price Index and limiting security deposits.

Portland has also responded to Maine's 2022 statewide housing law LD 2003, which requires municipalities to allow increased housing density. In December 2023, the city council voted to allow up to four units on residential lots and eliminated parking requirements for these uses. The city has set a goal to build 256 new housing units per year from 2017 through 2027 and is currently on track to exceed this target. Since 2010, the city has approved approximately 6,400 housing units, though completion of approved projects has lagged.

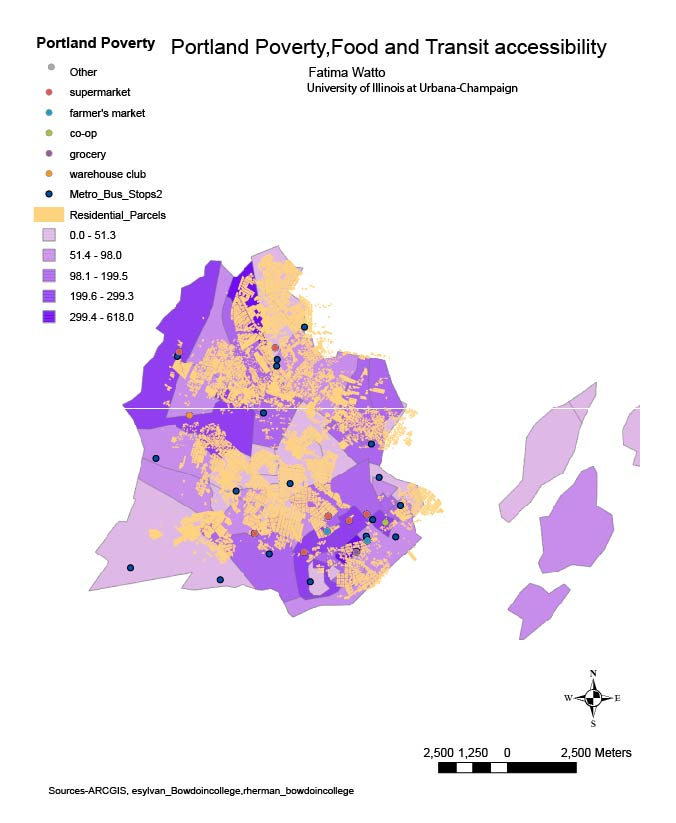
Map of Portland's poverty rate and accessibility to public transit and grocery stores

According to the 2023 American Community Survey's one-year estimates, its per capita income increased to $55,571. The median household income was $83,399 and roughly 8.7% of the population lived at or below the poverty line.

== Economy ==
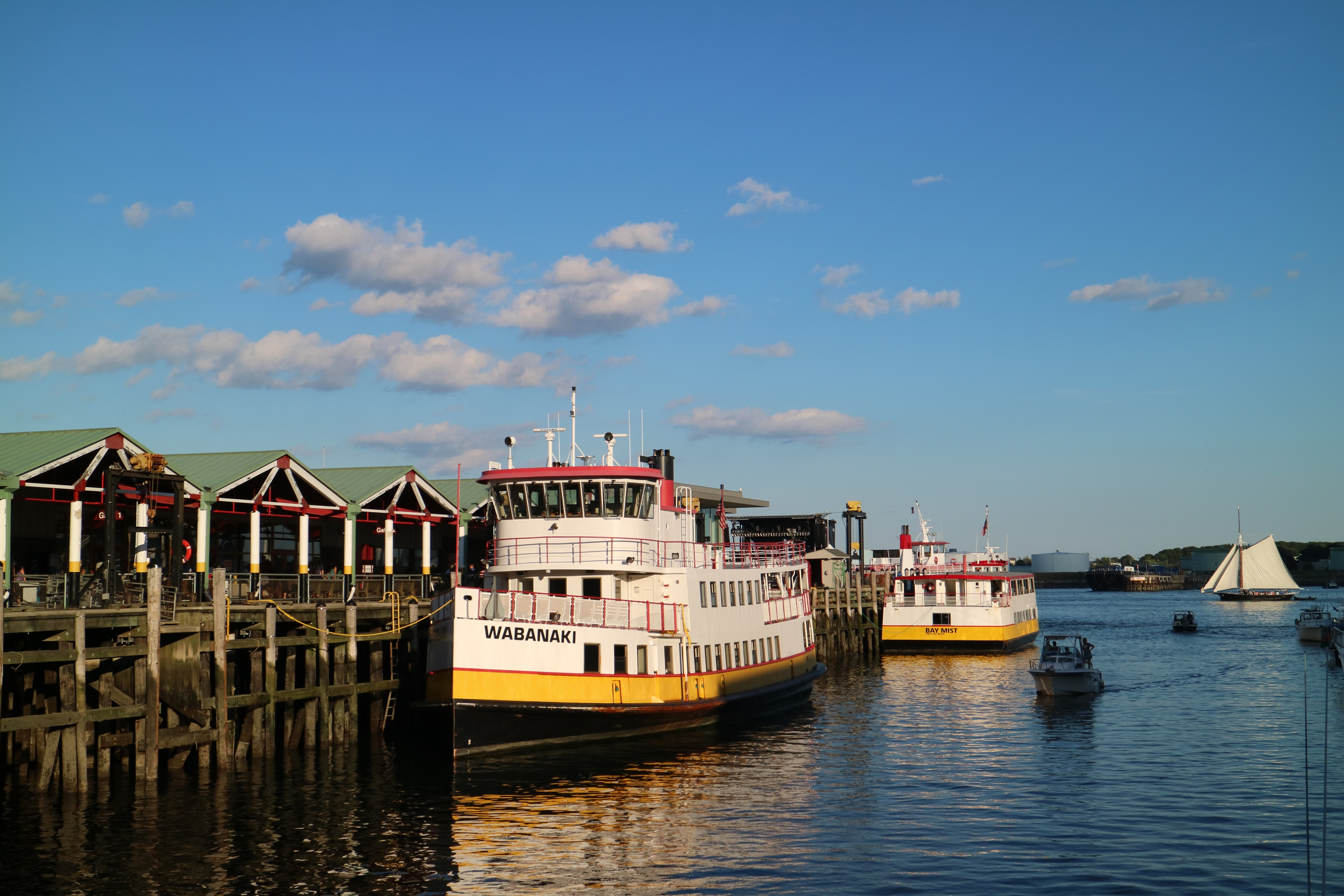
Municipal ferries on the Portland waterfront

Portland has become Maine's economic capital because the city has Maine's largest port, has Maine's largest population, and is close to Boston (105 miles to the southwest). Over the years, the local economy has shifted from fishing, manufacturing, and agriculture towards a more service-based economy. Most national bank institutions and other related financial organizations, such as Bank of America and Key Bank, base their Maine operations in Portland. Unum, Covetrus, TruChoice Federal Credit Union, M&T Bank, ImmuCell Corp, and Pioneer Telephone have headquarters here, and Portland's neighboring cities of South Portland, Westbrook and Scarborough, provide homes for other corporations including IDEXX and WEX Inc. Between 1867 and 2021, Burnham & Morrill Company, maker of B&M Baked Beans, had its main plant in Portland (the B&M Baked Beans factory).

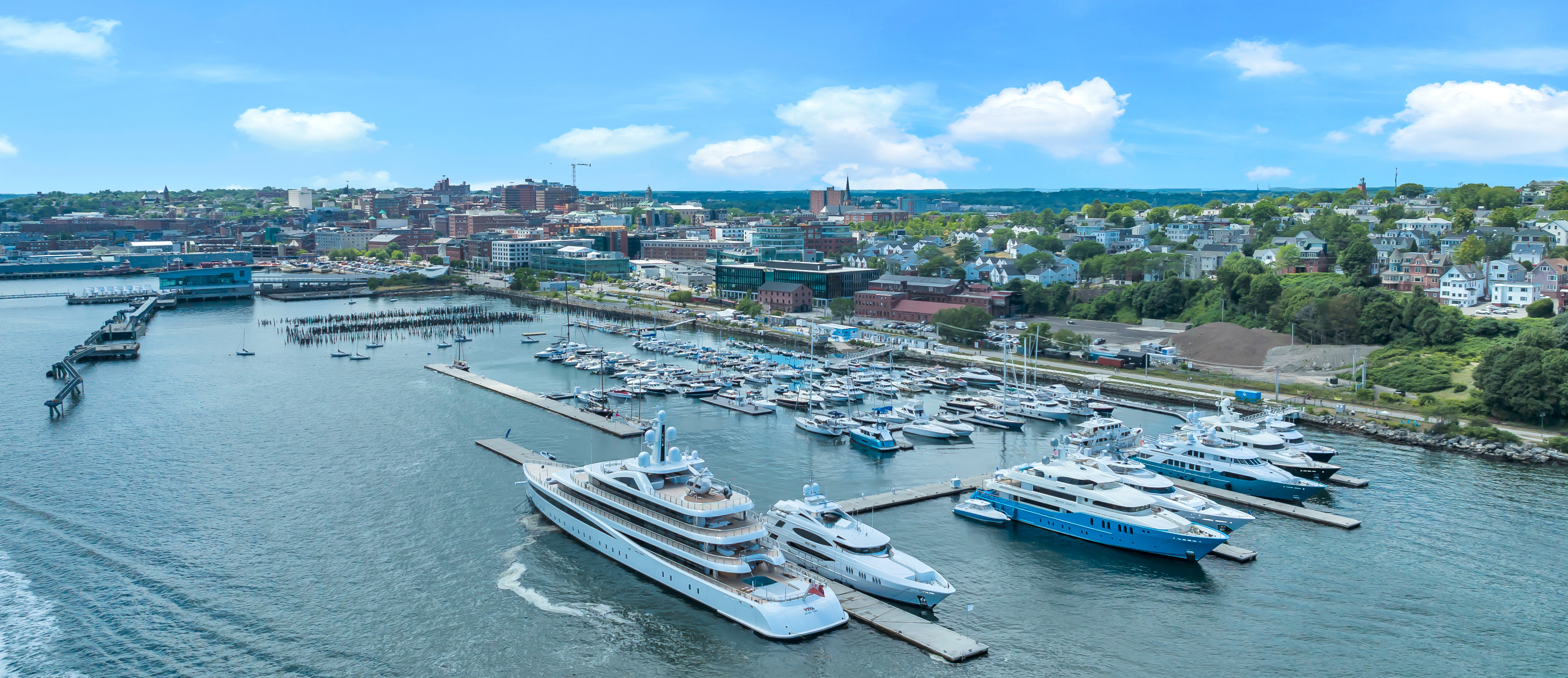
Portland's East End waterfront with new marina and high-tech companies.

The city's port is also undergoing a revival, and the first-ever container train departed from the new International Marine Terminal with fifteen containers of locally produced bottled tap water in early 2016.

In January 2020, Portland was announced to be the location of a new research institute that will focus on the application of artificial intelligence and machine learning. Northeastern University was selected by technology entrepreneur David Roux to lead the institute that will include programs that will allow graduate student research.

Portland also has a large subsidized housing industry, with several large real estate companies in the business.

== Arts and culture ==
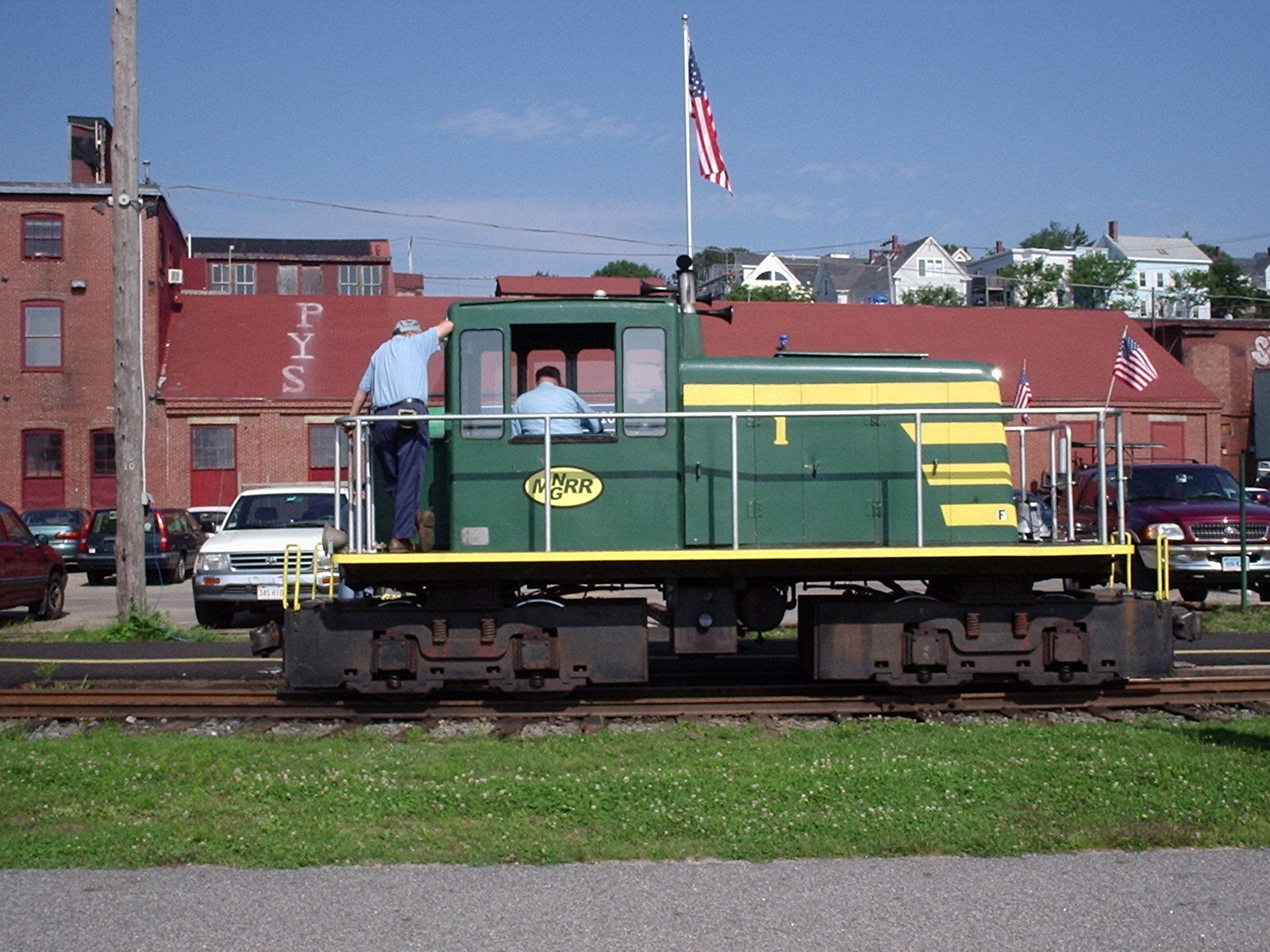
Maine Narrow Gauge Railroad Museum

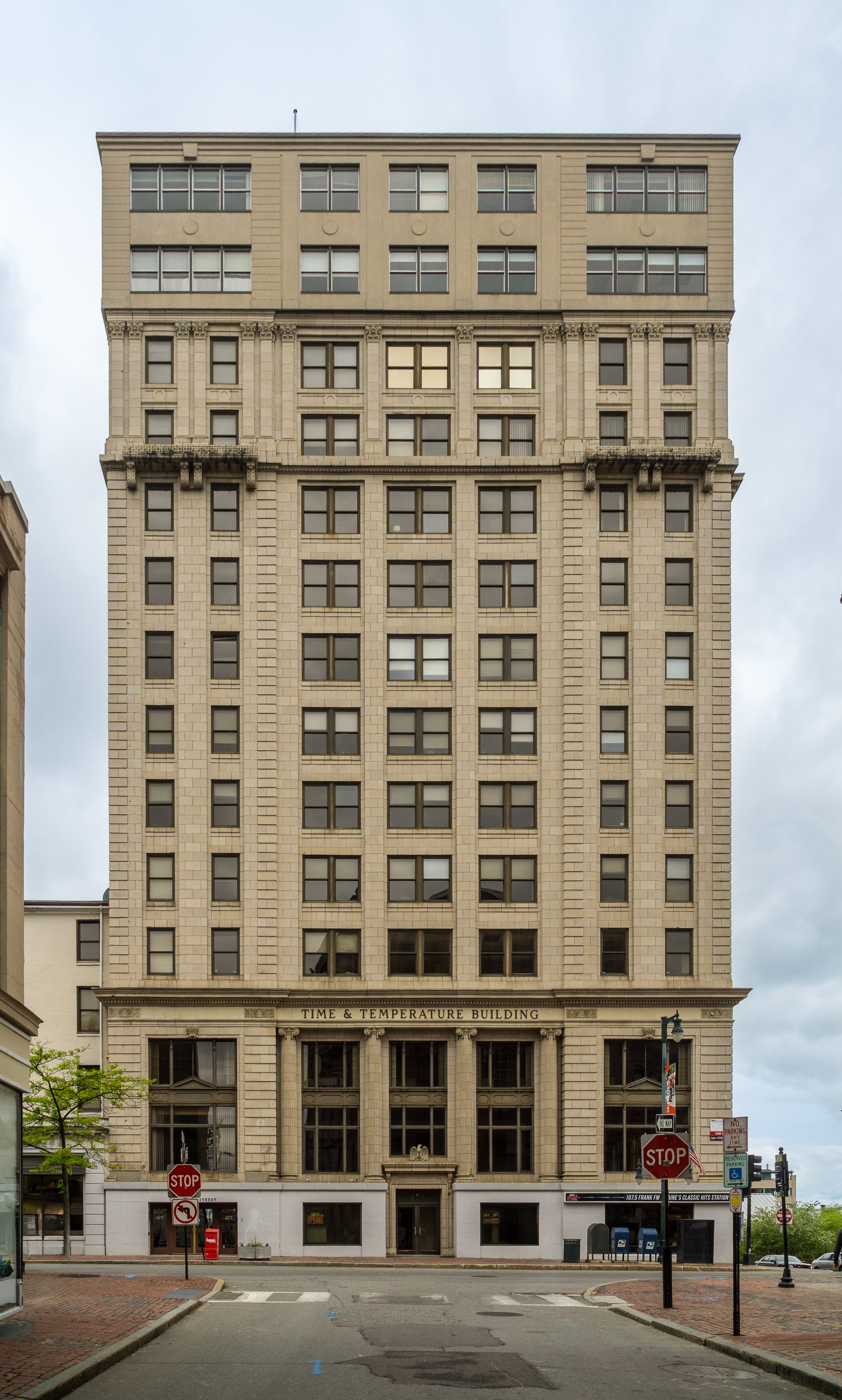
The Time and Temperature Building

Portland has a long history of prominence in the arts, peaking the first time in the early 19th century, when the city was "a rival, and not a satellite of either Boston or New York." In that period, Henry Wadsworth Longfellow got his start as a poet and John Neal held a central position in leading American literature toward its great renaissance, having founded Maine's first literary periodical, The Yankee, in 1828. Other notable literary or artistic figures who were contemporaries include Grenville Mellen, Nathaniel Parker Willis, Seba Smith, Elizabeth Oakes Smith, Benjamin Paul Akers, Charles Codman, Franklin Simmons, John Rollin Tilton, and Harrison Bird Brown. Since 2000, Portland has hosted a monthly First Friday Art Walk event which attracts more than 3,000 visitors.

=== Sites of interest ===
The Arts District, centered on Congress Street, is home to the Portland Museum of Art, Portland Stage Company, Maine Historical Society & Museum, Portland Public Library, Maine College of Art, SPACE Gallery, Children's Museum of Maine, Merrill Auditorium, the Kotzschmar Memorial Organ, and Portland Symphony Orchestra, as well as many smaller art galleries and studios.

Baxter Boulevard around Back Cove, Deering Oaks Park, the Eastern Promenade, Western Promenade, Lincoln Park and Riverton Park are all historical parks within the city. Other parks and natural spaces include Payson Park, Post Office Park, Baxter Woods, Evergreen Cemetery, Western Cemetery and the Fore River Sanctuary.

Thompson's Point, in the Libbytown neighborhood, has been a focus of renovation and redevelopment since the 2010s. The location hosts a concert venue, ice rink, hotels, restaurants, wineries, and breweries.

=== Notable buildings ===
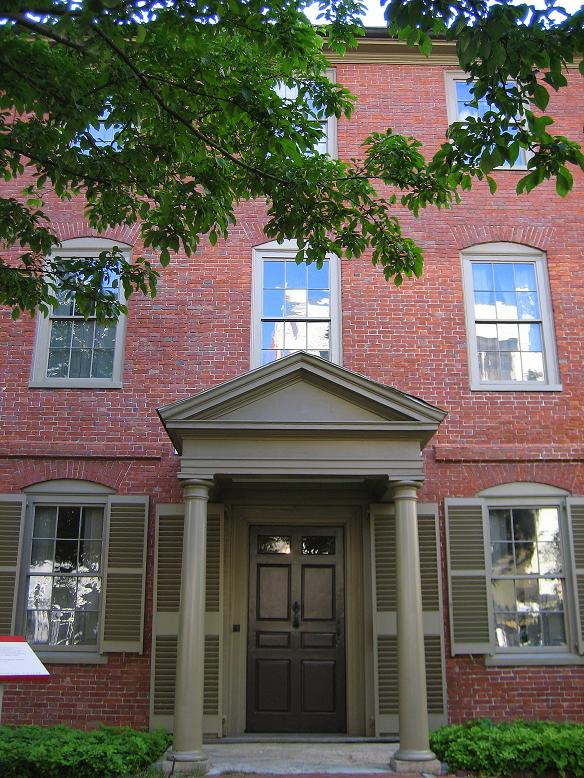
Wadsworth-Longfellow House

The spire of the Cathedral of the Immaculate Conception has been a notable feature of the Portland skyline since its completion in 1854. In 1859, Ammi B. Young designed the Marine Hospital, the first of three local works by Supervising Architects of the U.S. Treasury Department. Although the city lost to redevelopment its 1867 Greek Revival post office, which was designed by Alfred B. Mullett of white Vermont marble and featured a Corinthian portico, Portland retains his 1868 United States Custom House on Fore Street.

Franklin Towers is a 16-story residential tower. Between 1969 and 2023, at 175 feet (53 meters), it was Maine's tallest residential building. It was surpassed by 201 Federal Street, which is 29.5 feet (9.0 m) taller.

During the building boom of the 1980s, several new buildings rose on the peninsula, including the 1983 Charles Shipman Payson Building by Henry N. Cobb of Pei, Cobb, Freed & Partners at the Portland Museum of Art complex (a component of which is the 1801 McLellan-Sweat Mansion), and the Back Bay Tower, a fifteen-story residential building completed in 1990.

477 Congress Street (known locally as the Time and Temperature Building) is situated near Monument Square in the Arts District and is a major landmark: the 14-story building features a large electronic sign on its roof that flashes time and temperature data, as well as parking-ban information in the winter. The building is home to several radio stations. The Press Herald Building, at 390 Congress Street, is strategically located across Congress Street from Portland City Hall and was built in 1923. It was expanded in 1948 for use as the newspaper's headquarters.

The Westin Portland Harborview, completed in 1927, is a prominent hotel located downtown on High Street. Photographer Todd Webb lived in Portland during his later years and took many pictures of the city. Some of Webb's pictures can be found at the Evans Gallery.

=== Media ===
The city is home to one daily newspaper, The Portland Press Herald/Maine Sunday Telegram, founded in 1862. The Press Herald is published Monday through Saturday and The Maine Sunday Telegram is published on Sundays. Both are published by MaineToday Media Inc., which also operates an entertainment website, MaineToday.com and owns papers in Augusta, Waterville, and Bath.

Other publications include The Portland Forecaster, a weekly newspaper; The Bollard, a monthly alternative magazine formerly known as Mainer; The West End News, The Munjoy Hill Observer, The Baysider, The Waterfront, Portland Magazine, and The Companion. Portland is also the home office of The Exception Magazine, an online newspaper which covers Maine.

The Portland broadcast media market is the largest one in Maine for both radio and television. Radio stations located in Portland include WFNK (Classic Hits), WJJB (Sports), WTHT (Country), WBQW (Classical), WHXR (Rock), WHOM (Adult Contemporary), WJBQ (Top 40), WCLZ (Adult Album Alternative), WBLM (Classic Rock), WYNZ (1960s–1970s Hits), and WCYY (Modern Rock). WMPG is a local non-commercial radio station run by community members and the University of Southern Maine. The Maine Public Broadcasting Network's (MPBN) radio news operations are based in Portland.

Television stations include WCSH 6 (NBC), WMTW 8 (ABC), WGME 13 (CBS), WPFO 23 (Fox), WIPL 35 (ION), and WPXT 51 (The CW; MyNetworkTV on DT3). There is no PBS member station licensed to the city of Portland, but the market is served by MPBN outlets WCBB (channel 10) in Augusta and WMEA-TV (channel 26) in Biddeford.

Channel number	Call sign	Network	Owner
6	WCSH	NBC	Tegna Inc.
8	WMTW	ABC	Hearst Television
10	WCBB	PBS	Maine Public Broadcasting Network
13	WGME	CBS	Sinclair Broadcast Group
23	WPFO	Fox	Cunningham Broadcasting
26	WMEA-TV	PBS	Maine Public Broadcasting Network
35	WIPL	Ion Television	Ion Media
51	WPXT	The CW; MyNetworkTV (DT3)	Hearst Television

==== Historical newspapers ====
Newspapers formerly published in Portland include The Pleasure Boat, Eastern Argus, Evening Express, Casco Bay Weekly,The Portland Daily Sun and The Portland Phoenix.

=== Traditions ===
==== Valentine's Day Phantom ====
In 1976, a group of unknown individuals started the tradition of the Valentine's Day Phantom by plastering the city with hearts on Valentine's Day. In 1986, the U.S. Coast Guard almost intercepted a boat filled with Valentine's Day Phantoms after it nearly hit a Casco Bay Ferry. The boat made it to Fort Gorges and unfurled a heart banner. The banner appeared on the uninhabited island fort again in 2017. The heart flag appeared on the flag pole at Central Fire Station in 2021. One leader of the effort, Kevin Farnham, was publicly identified in 2023, when he died. His family revealed Farnham's involvement but said he was not the founder. The Farnham family established a charitable foundation called Be A Kevin to help keep the tradition alive.

==== First Friday Art Walk ====
In 2000, the First Friday Art Walk was started by gallery owners in the Arts District who opened from 5 to 8 p.m. on the first Friday of each month. By 2012, the event had become so popular that gallery owners feared the event was becoming too much like a festival with street performers and vendors.

== Food and beverage ==
=== Number of restaurants ===
Downtown Portland, including the Arts District and the Old Port, has a high concentration of eating and drinking establishments, with many more to be found throughout the rest of the peninsula and outlying neighborhoods. The city is also home to numerous food trucks and food carts which park on the city streets and at festivals, events, and breweries. Most operate in the summer; a few operate year-round.

Notable restaurants include Fore Street, Duckfat, Becky's Diner, and The Great Lost Bear.

=== Food recognition ===
Portland has developed a national reputation for the quality of its restaurants, eateries, and food culture. The city has been visited by many food shows, including Rachael Ray's Food Network show $40 a Day, the Travel Channel's Man v. Food, and Anthony Bourdain: No Reservations. Bon Appetit named Portland the Restaurant City of the Year in 2018.

=== Beverages ===
Portland is home to numerous juice bars, coffee shops, coffee roasteries, tea houses, distilleries, microbreweries and brewpubs.

Brewers include the D. L. Geary Brewing Company, Gritty McDuff's Brewing Company, Shipyard Brewing Company, and Allagash Brewing Company. Portland's spirits industry has also grown in recent years.

The city is known for its pure tap water. Sebago Lake, the primary source of the city's potable water, is one of fifty surface-water supplies among 13,000 in the country that the Environmental Protection Agency says do not need filtration. Water is piped to Portland from Sebago Lake by the Portland Water District.

=== Farmers markets ===
The Portland Farmers' Market takes place Wednesdays in Monument Square, Saturdays in Deering Oaks Park (from early May to the end of November), and Saturdays at The Maine Girls Academy (from early December to the end of April).

=== Vegetarian food ===
Portland's vegetarian-friendly restaurants number more than 200 in 2020, according to the Maine Sunday Telegram. Celebrity chef Toni Fiore first filmed the PBS cooking show Totally Vegetarian in 2002 at the cable access station in Portland. The Portland Press Herald has featured a vegan column by Avery Yale Kamila in its Food & Dining section since 2009. In 2011, the Portland Public Schools added a daily vegetarian cold lunch to its school menu choices. In 2019, the district changed to a daily hot vegan school meal option.

=== Food festivals ===
Portland hosts a number of food and beverage festivals, including:

- Festival of Nations, takes place in July in Deering Oaks Park and organized by group of local organizations
- Greek Festival, three-day event in June at Holy Trinity Greek Orthodox Church
- Harvest on the Harbor, multi-day event takes place in October
- Italian Street Festival & Bazaar, three-day event in August outside St. Peter's Parish commemorates the Feast of the Assumption of the Blessed Virgin Mary and the Feast of Saint Rocco
- Maine Brewers Festival, held multiple times a year by the Maine Brewers' Guild
- Maine VegFest, takes place in October and organized by Maine Animal Coalition since 2005; the event features all vegan food and was originally called Maine Vegetarian Food Festival
- Taste of the Nation, fundraiser for food insecurity that stopped after 2015 but happened again in 2019
- Maine Restaurant Week, takes place over twelve days in March
- Maine Seaweed Week, takes place in the spring

=== Food history ===
Alice Greele's Tavern operated at the corner of Congress Street and Hampshire Street beginning in 1735. The tavern was known for its baked beans. Alice Greele's Tavern served as a political meeting place during and after the American Revolution. When the British bombed Portland in 1776, Greele remained with the tavern and was able to save it from the flames that burned most of the city.

Since 1768, the Portland Farmers Market has been in operation. It was first established in the Town Hall that "served 136 families on the peninsula."

Portland is where national Prohibition started. Portland mayor and temperance leader Neal Dow led Maine to ban alcohol sales in 1851. The law led to the Portland Rum Riot in 1855. In 1845, The Pleasure Boat was the earliest vegetarian publication in Maine.

Canned corn was developed in Portland by the N. Winslow company. By 1852 the Winslow's Patent Hermetically Sealed Green Corn was a commercial success and the company became a world leader in the canning industry. An historic B&M Baked Beans canning plant built in 1913 operated on the waterfront until 2021 when it closed and production moved to the midwest. By late 2022, B&M customers were reporting that the baked beans were undercooked, crunchy, and tasted different. Customers speculated that the beans were no longer being baked. Some customers were hoarding B&M bean cans produced at the Portland plant.

in 1880, Maine's first documented Chinese restaurant opened on Custom House Wharf and was operated by Ar Tee Lam.

In the early 20th century, a Little Italy neighborhood developed around India Street. The city's Amato's Italian delicatessen on India Street is reported to be the birthplace of the Maine Italian sandwich, called "an Italian" by locals, which Amato's first served in 1902. The Village Restaurant, an Italian restaurant in the city's East End, was in operation for 71 years, from 1936 to 2007. In 1949, Miccuci's Grocery Co., an Italian grocery store, opened on India Street and remains in business.

In the 1970s and 1980s, The Hollow Reed was a notable vegetarian restaurant on Fore Street cited for its influence on the city's restaurant culture. In 1979, The Great Lost Bear opened on Forest Avenue and was recognized for its large selection of draft craft beers. In 1982 DiMillo's on the Water opened in a former car ferry docked at Portland's Long Wharf. In 1988, the Gritty McDuff's brewpub was founded on Fore Street and is considered the first brewpub to open in Maine since Prohibition ended. In 1989, Marcy's Diner opened on Free Street, and in 2015 it made international headlines following a spat between the then-cook-owner and a patron over the latter's screaming child.

In 1991, Becky's Diner opened on Commercial Street, after it got an exception to the city's zoning laws prohibiting non-fishery businesses on the waterfront, and has attracted famous patrons including Taylor Swift and president Bill Clinton. In 2007, the Green Elephant opened on Congress Street and received critical attention for the vegetarian menu.

In 2024, ZU Bakery, located in the West End, won the James Beard award for Outstanding Bakery, and Atsuko Fujimoto, owner of Norimoto Bakery in Deering Center, won the James Beard award for Outstanding Pastry Chef or Baker.

== Sports ==
=== Portland teams ===
The city is home to four minor league teams. The Portland Sea Dogs, the Double-A farm team of the Boston Red Sox, play at Hadlock Field. The Maine Celtics, the NBA G League affiliate of the Boston Celtics, play at the Portland Exposition Building. The Maine Mariners, ECHL affiliates of the Boston Bruins, play at Cross Insurance Arena. A USL League One soccer team was granted to Portland in 2023. The team, called Portland Hearts of Pine, began play in 2025.

The city is also home to Portland Rugby Football Club, the oldest continually active sports team in the city, founded in 1969. The team competes in Division II of the New England Rugby Football Union. Other pro and semi-pro sports teams in the city include the Portland Lumberjacks, a bowling team competing in the PBA League, the Maine Cats, an Australian rules football team competing in the United States Australian Football League, and Portland Rising, a women's ultimate team competing in the Premier Ultimate League. In 2024, Sports Business Journal ranked Portland as the best minor league sports market in America.

Team	Sport	League	Venue	Established	Championships	Affiliation
Maine Cats	Australian rules football	USAFL	Dougherty Field	2018 (Note: In 2023, the Cats merged with the Boston Demons temporarily. The Cats resumed as a standalone club in 2025.)	0	None
Portland Sea Dogs	Baseball	Eastern League	Hadlock Field	1994	1	Boston Red Sox (since 2003)
Maine Celtics	Basketball	NBA G League	Portland Exposition Building	2009	0	Boston Celtics (since 2009)
Maine Mariners	Ice hockey	ECHL	Cross Insurance Arena	2018	0	Boston Bruins (since 2021)
Portland Hearts of Pine	Soccer	USL League One	Fitzpatrick Stadium	2025	0	None
Portland Rugby Football Club	Rugby union	New England Rugby Football Union	Fox Street Field	1969	1	None
Maine Roller Derby	Roller Derby	WFTDA	Portland Exposition Building	2006	0	None
Portland Lumberjacks	Team bowling	PBA League	Bayside Bowl	2016	3	None
Portland Rising	Ultimate	PUL	Fitzpatrick Stadium	2020 (Note: The Rising are currently on hiatus, and not participating in the 2025 PUL season.)	0	None

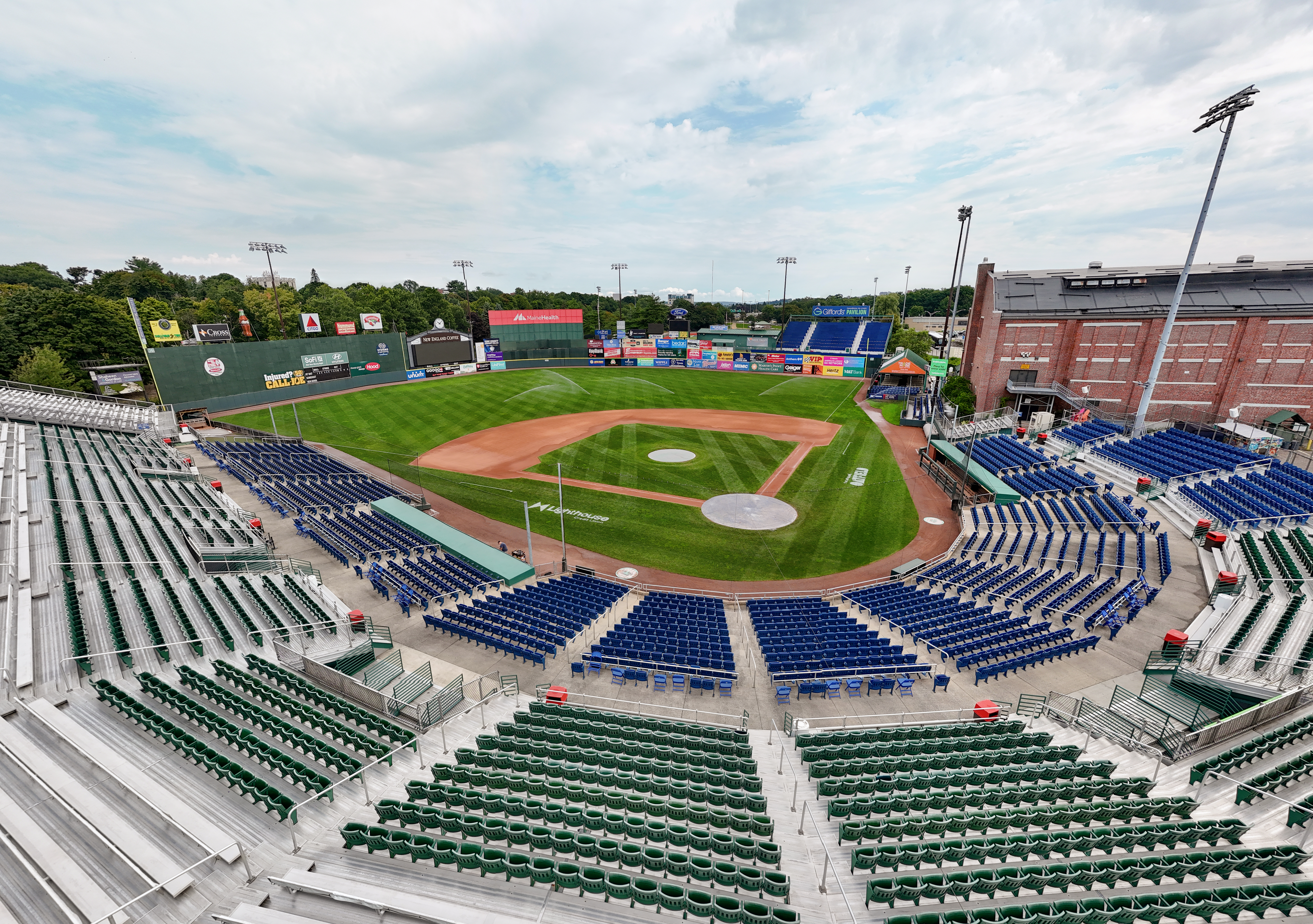
Hadlock Field, home of the Portland Sea Dogs

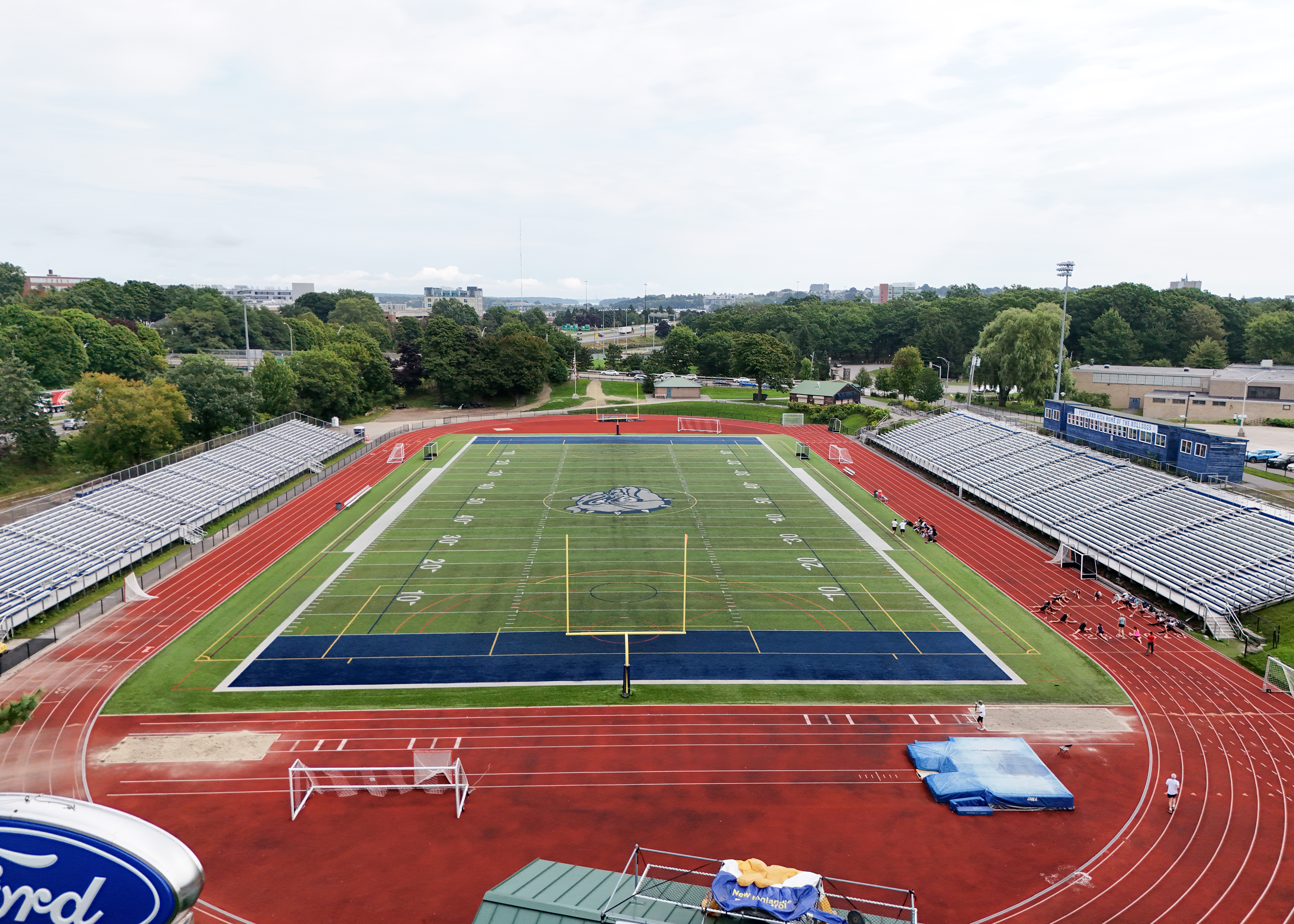
Fitzpatrick Stadium, home of the Portland Hearts of Pine and Portland High School outdoor sports.

=== Former sports teams ===
Previously, Portland was home of several minor league ice hockey teams: the Maine Mariners (AHL) from 1977 to 1992 and the Portland Pirates (AHL) from 1993 to 2016. The Mariners were three-time Calder Cup winners, winning it in 1978, 1979 and 1984, while the Pirates would win the Calder Cup in 1995. The Mariners originally moved from Portland to Utica, New York, in 1987, but the AHL granted an expansion team to Portland that assumed the Mariners' name and logo. The second Mariners moved to Providence, Rhode Island, in 1992 to become the Providence Bruins. The Pirates came to Portland from Baltimore, where they were known as the Baltimore Skipjacks, and moved to Springfield, Massachusetts in 2016 to become the Springfield Thunderbirds.

GPS Portland Phoenix men's soccer teams played in USL League Two from 2009 until 2020.

The Maine Mammoths of the National Arena League played in 2018 and were the first indoor football team to call Portland home. The team suspended operations after one season while it negotiated with local ownership groups, but was ultimately dissolved.

=== Sports facilities ===
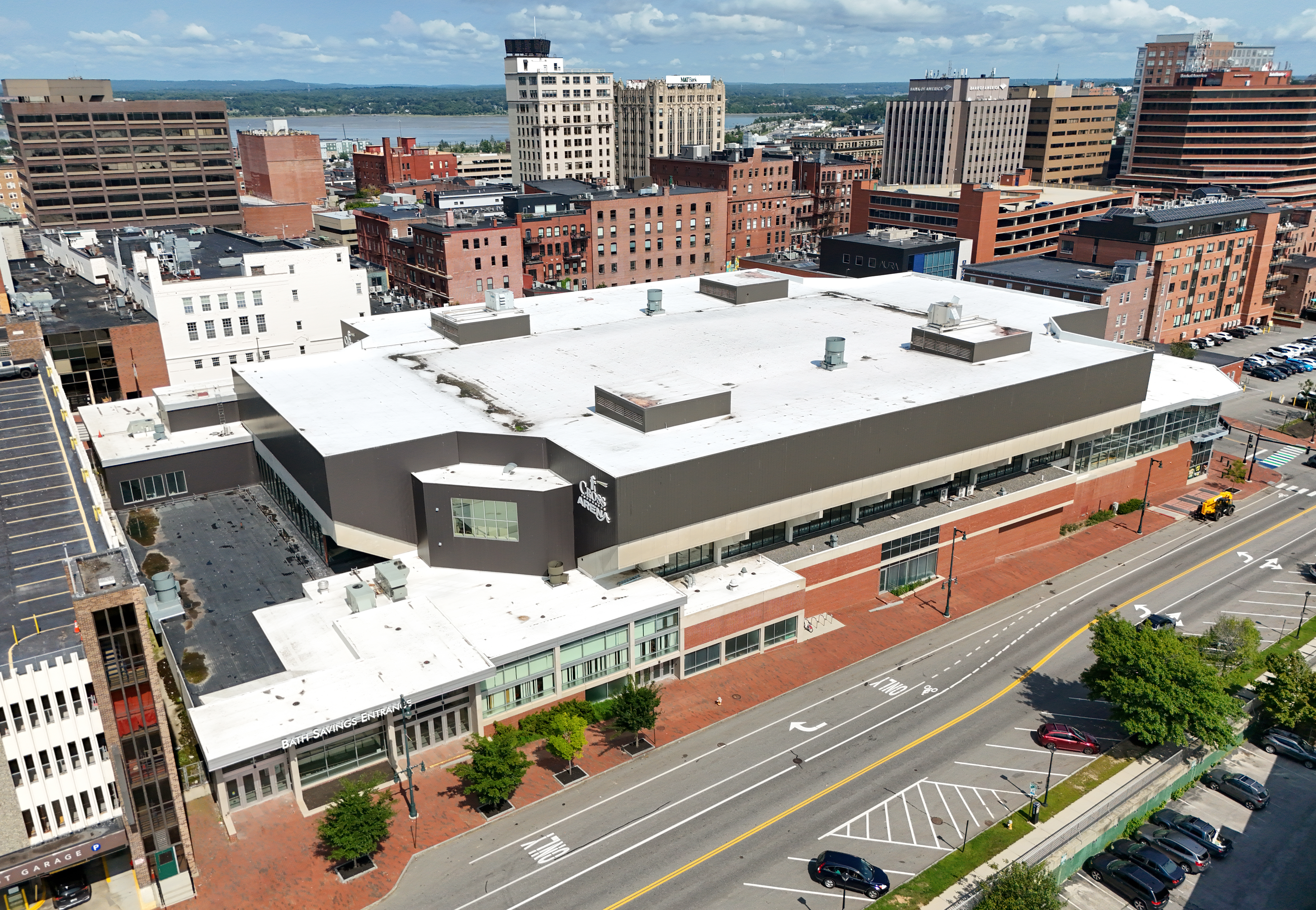
Cross Insurance Arena

The Portland Sports Complex, located off of Park and Brighton Avenues, near I-295 and Deering Oaks park, houses several of the city's stadiums and arenas, including:

- Hadlock Field – baseball (Capacity 7,368)
- Fitzpatrick Stadium – football, soccer, lacrosse, field hockey, and outdoor track (Capacity 6,000+ seated)
- Portland Exposition Building – basketball, indoor track, concerts and trade shows (Capacity 3,000)
- Portland Ice Arena – hockey and figure skating (Capacity 400)

Cross Insurance Arena has 6,733 permanent seats following renovation in 2014.

The Portland area has eleven professional golf courses, 124 tennis courts, and 95 playgrounds. There are also over 100 mi (160 km) of nature trails.

Portland hosts the Maine Marathon each October.

Bayside Bowl was expanded in 2017 to 20 lanes, including a rooftop deck. It hosted the 2017 PBA League and Elias Cup.

Memorial Stadium is the home of the Deering High School sports teams and is located behind the school.

== Parks and recreation ==
The city of Portland includes more than 700 acres of open space and public parks, the most well-known of which are the Eastern Promenade, Western Promenade and Deering Oaks. The city and surrounding communities are linked by 70 miles of trails, both urban and wooded, maintained by the nonprofit Portland Trails. The Portland Parks Conservancy, which was established in 2019, is a nonprofit organization that raises money to support Portland's park system. In 2021, the Portland Parks Conservancy funded the establishment of the Portland Youth Corp. The Portland Youth Corp performs work in Portland's parks and residents between the ages of 14 and 16 can apply to participate in the paid program.

=== Organic land care ===
The city requires organic land care techniques be used on both public and private property. In 2018, the Portland City Council banned the use of synthetic pesticides. In 2020, the city received a $10,000 grant from Hannaford, Stonyfield Farm, and Osborn Organics to pay for soil tests and other start up costs of transitioning the heavily used Fox Field in Kennedy Park to an organic maintenance plan.

=== Historic parks ===
Historic parks include:

- Baxter Boulevard
- Baxter Woods
- Congress Square Park
- Deering Oaks
- Eastern Promenade
- Fort Sumner Park
- Kennedy Park
- Lincoln Park
- Payson Park
- Riverside Municipal Golf Course
- Western Promenade

=== Parks with trails ===
Notable trails and parks with multiple trails include:

- Bayside Trail
- East End Trail
- Evergreen Cemetery
- Fore River Sanctuary
- Quarry Run Dog Park
- Riverton Trolley Park

=== Parks with water features ===
Parks with splash pads, pools and beaches include:

- East End Beach
- Deering Oaks Ravine
- Kiwanis Pool
- Payson Park
- Peppermint Park
- Stone Street Playground

== Government ==
City Hall

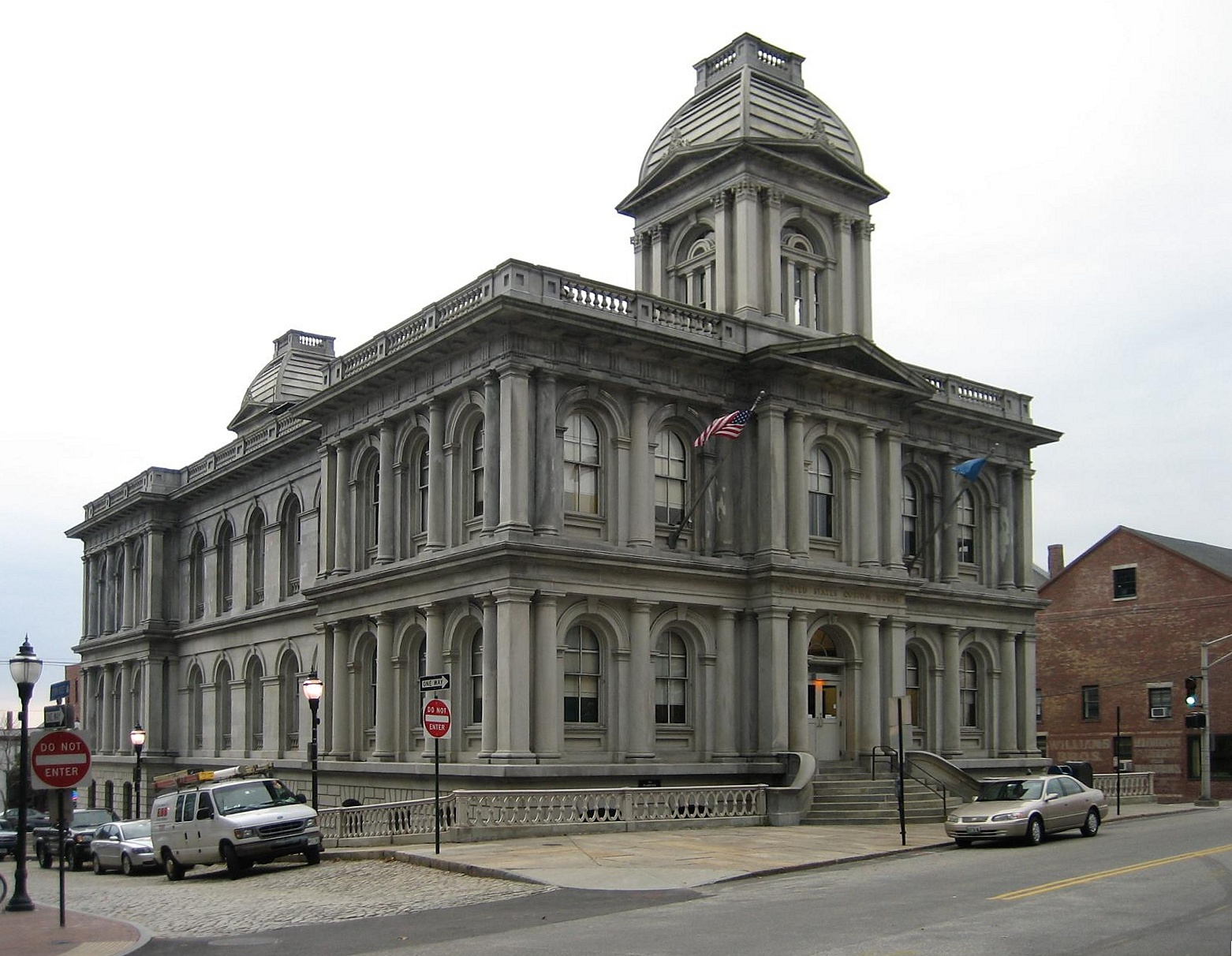
United States Custom House, completed 1872

The city has adopted a council-manager style government that is detailed in the city charter. The citizens of Portland are represented by a nine-member city council which makes policy, passes ordinances, approves appropriations, appoints the city manager and oversees the municipal government. The city council of nine members is elected by the citizens of Portland. The city has five voting districts, with each district electing a city councilor to represent their neighborhood interests for a three-year term. There are also four members of the city council who are elected at-large. The four at-large members are elected through Proportional ranked-choice voting.

From 1923 until 2011, city councilors chose one of themselves each year to serve as Mayor of Portland, a primarily ceremonial position. On November 2, 2010, Portland voters narrowly approved a measure that allowed them to elect the mayor. On November 8, 2011, former State Senator and candidate for U.S. Congress Michael F. Brennan was elected as mayor. On December 5, 2011, he was sworn in as the first citizen-elected mayor in 88 years (see Portland, Maine mayoral election, 2011). The office of mayor is a four-year position that earns a salary of 150% of the city's median income. The current mayor is Mark Dion, who narrowly defeated city councilor Andrew Zarro after 5 ranked choice rounds in the November 2023 election.

A city manager is appointed by the city council. The city manager oversees the daily operations of the city government, appoints the heads of city departments, and prepares annual budgets. The city manager directs all city agencies and departments, and is responsible for the executing laws and policies passed by the city council. The current city manager is Danielle West.

Aside from the main city council, there is also an elected school board for the Portland Public School system. The school board is made up in the same manner of the city council, with five district members, four at-large members and one chairman. There are also three students from the local high schools elected to serve on the board. There are many other boards and committees such as the Planning Committee, Board of Appeals, and Harbor Commission, etc. These committees and boards have limited power in their respective areas of expertise. Members of boards and committees are appointed by city council members.

On November 5, 2013, Portland voters overwhelmingly approved an ordinance to legalize the possession and private use of cannabis for adults, making the city the first municipality in the Eastern United States to do so.

James E. Craig was chief of the Portland Police Department from 2009 to 2011. He would later go on to become the chief of the Cincinnati Police Department and Detroit Police Department.

In the U.S. House of Representatives, Portland is included in Maine's 1st congressional district and is currently represented by Democrat Chellie M. Pingree.

Portland city vote by party in presidential elections
Year	Democratic	Republican	Third Parties
2024	79.50% 31,670	15.39% 6,130	3.86% 1,538
2020	81.33% 33,786	15.61% 6,486	3.06% 1,272
2016	75.90% 28,534	18.06% 6,789	6.05% 2,273
2012	76.32% 27,739	20.60% 7,488	3.08% 1,118
2008	76.87% 28,317	21.29% 7,844	1.84% 679
2004	72.60% 26,800	25.61% 9,455	1.79% 661
2000	63.41% 20,506	27.33% 8,838	9.27% 2,997
1996	64.04% 19,755	23.27% 7,178	12.69% 3,915
1992	55.31% 19,510	24.55% 8,660	20.14% 7,104

Voter registration

Voter Registration and Party Enrollment as of October 21, 2022
Party	Total Voters	Percentage
Democratic	30,544	64.05%
Unenrolled/Independent	10,313	21.63%
Republican	5,063	10.62%
Green Independent	1,728	3.62%
Libertarian	40	0.08%
Total	47,688	100.00%

== Education ==
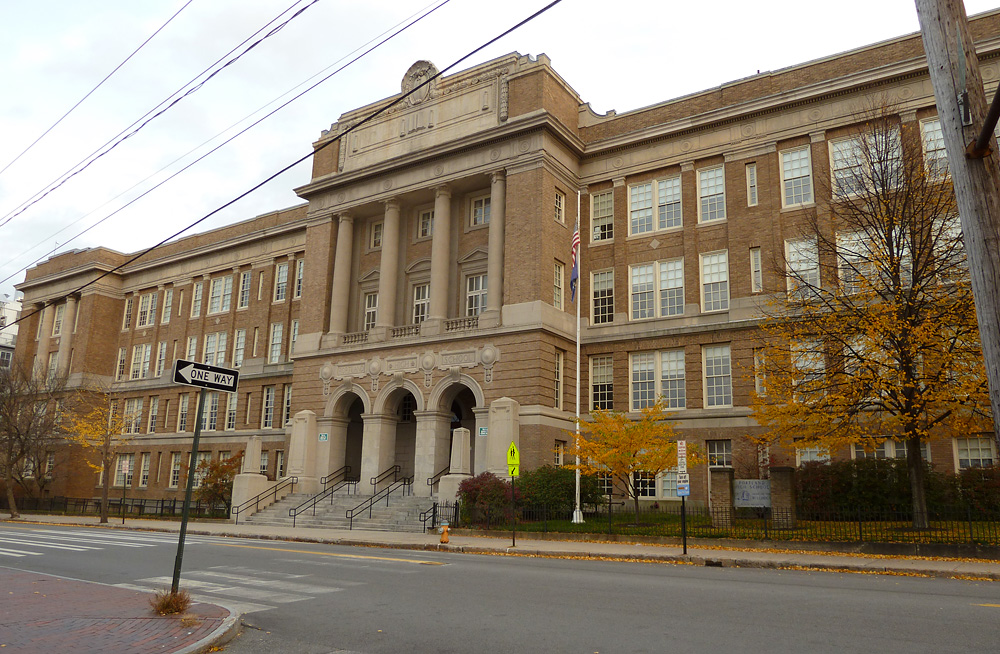
Portland High School

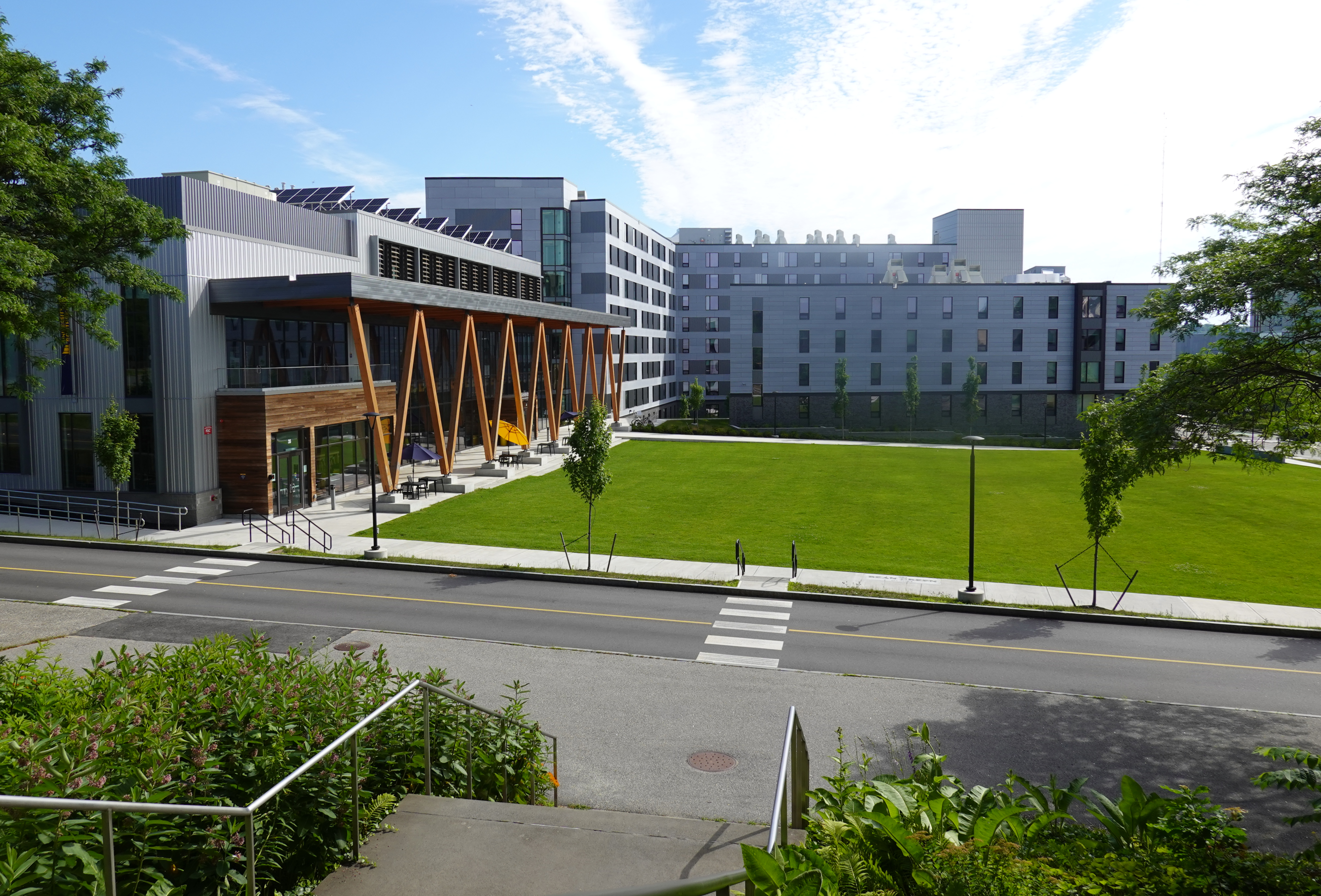
New buildings at USM in Portland

Portland has a long history of public and private education. The private Portland Academy was founded in 1794. Portland High School, a public school, opened in 1821. The oldest portion of the current Portland High School was built in 1862-1863. The Maine College of Art was established in 1882. Waynflete was established in 1898. Portland University opened in 1921. Portland Junior College opened in 1933, and it became the University of Maine Portland in 1957. Portland University merged with Portland Junior College in 1961. In 1970, the schools merged with the Gorham State Teachers College in Gorham to become the University of Southern Maine.

=== High schools ===
- Baxter Academy for Technology and Science (charter)
- Casco Bay High School (public-expeditionary)
- Cheverus High School (private)
- Deering High School (public)
- Portland Arts & Technology High School (public-vocational)
- Portland High School (public)
- Waynflete School (private)

=== Colleges and universities ===
College expansions got underway in 2022 at the University of Southern Maine to add a 580-bed dorm, at the University of New England to move the medical school from Biddeford into a new $93 million building on the Portland campus, and at the Northeastern University Roux Institute to build a campus on the site of the former B&M Baked Beans factory have the potential, within two decades, to bring the total college and university students in the city to 15,000, which would be similar to the percentage of students in Boston.

- Institute for Doctoral Studies in the Visual Arts
- Maine College of Art
- Roux Institute
- University of Maine School of Law
- University of New England
- University of Southern Maine

== Infrastructure ==
=== Fire department ===
The Portland Fire Department (PFD) provides fire protection and emergency medical services to the city. Established on March 29, 1768, the PFD is made up of over 230 paid, professional firefighters and operates out of seven fire stations, located throughout the city, in addition to those staffed by "on-call" firefighters on Peaks Island, Great Diamond Island, Cushing Island and Cliff Island. The Portland Fire Department also operates an Airport Division Station at 1001 Westbrook St., at the Portland International Jetport, and a Marine Division Station, located at 54 Commercial St.

=== Police ===
The Portland Police Department is the largest municipal police department in the State of Maine.

=== Hospitals ===
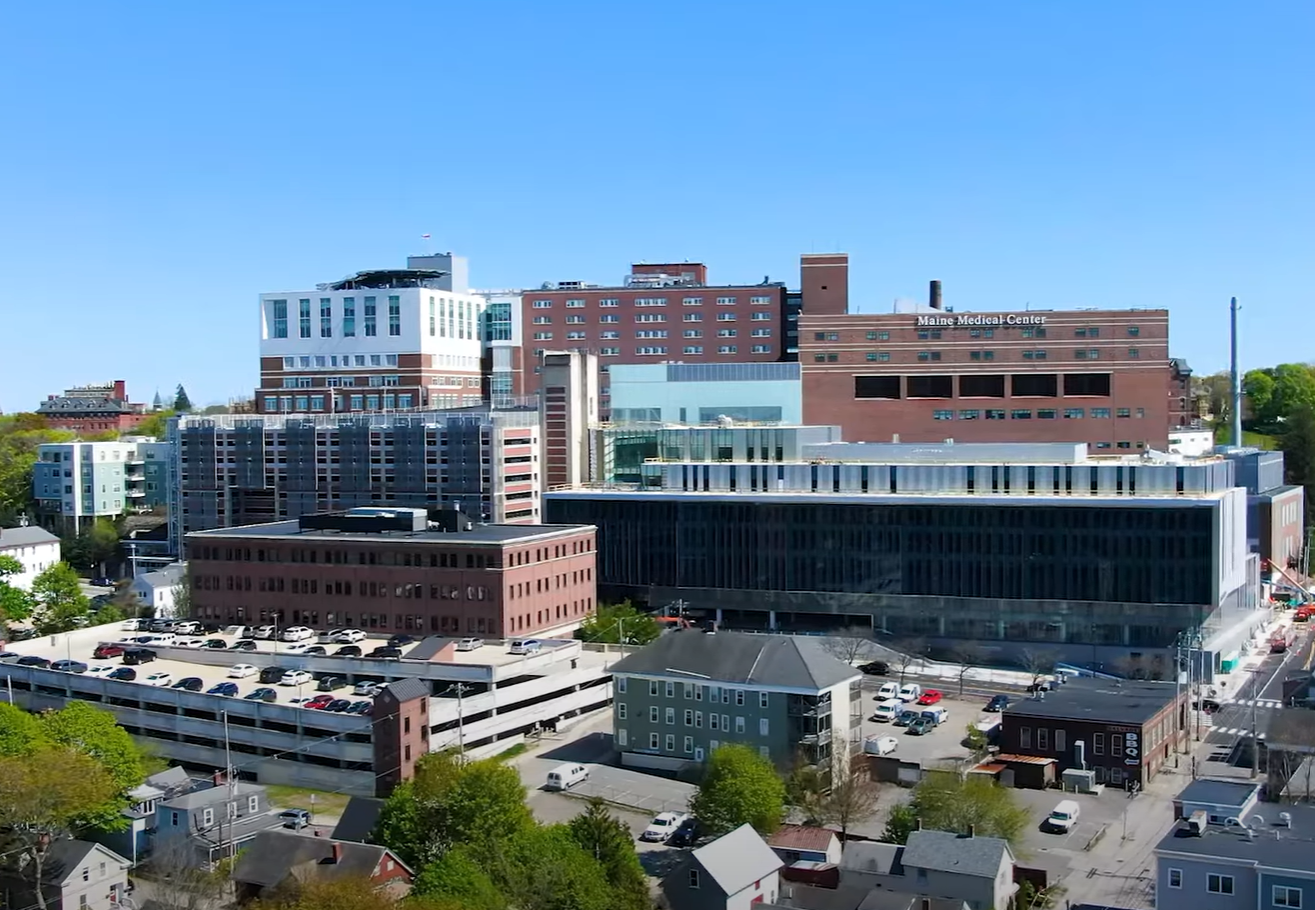
Maine Medical Center (2024)

Maine Medical Center is the state's only Level I trauma center and is the largest hospital in Maine.

Mercy Hospital, a faith-based institution, is the fourth largest in the state. It completed the first phase of its new campus along the Fore River in 2008.

The formerly-independent Brighton Medical Center (once known as the Osteopathic Hospital) is now owned by Maine Medical Center and is operated as a minor care center under the names Brighton First Care and New England Rehab. In 2010, Maine Medical Center's Hannaford Center for Safety, Innovation, and Simulation opened at the Brighton campus. The former Portland General Hospital is now home to the Barron Center nursing facility.

=== Wastewater management ===
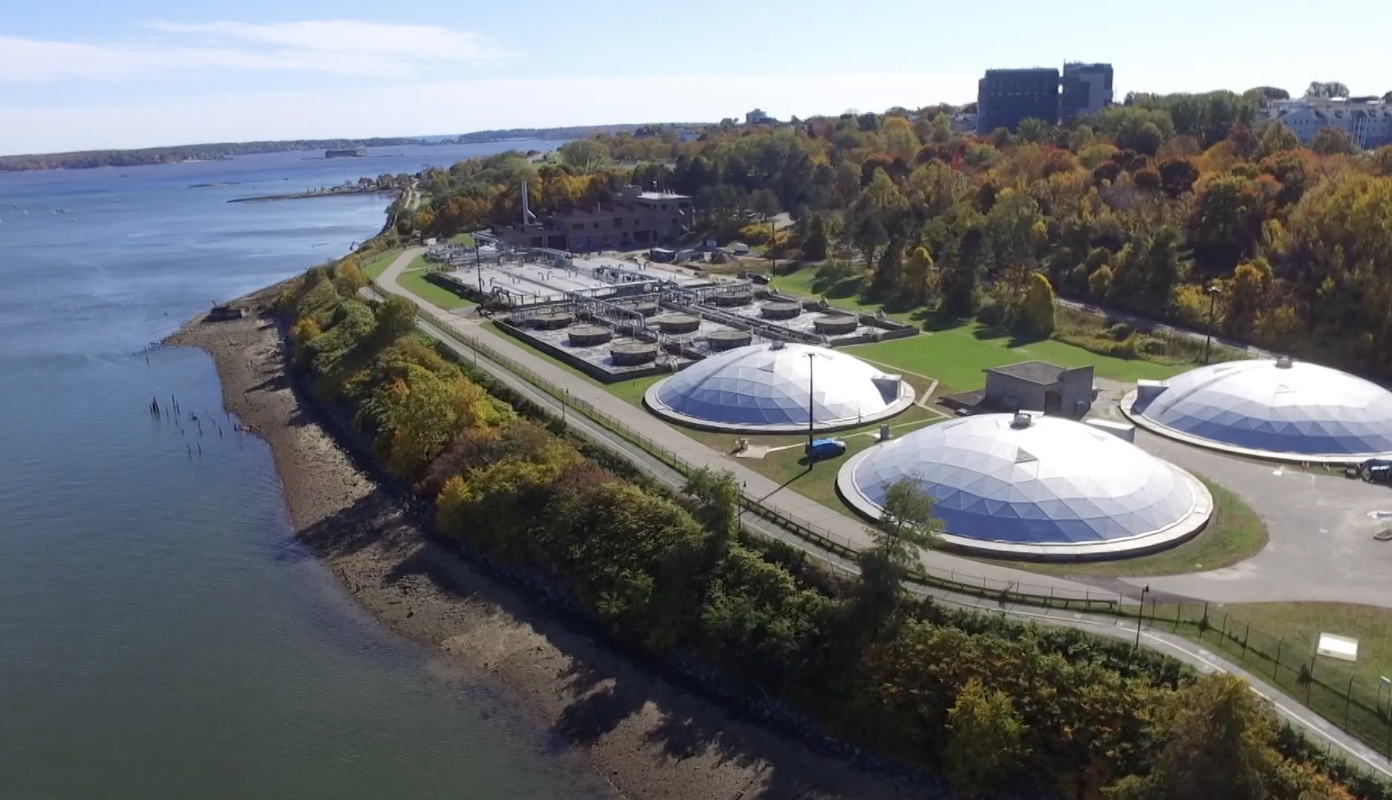
East End Treatment Plant

One wastewater management project is named the Bedford Street Sewer Separation, with its goal to "improve the water quality and health of Back Cove by reducing the amount of combined sewer overflows (CSO) that overflow during heavy rain events through the use of sewer separation and water treatment devices."

East End Treatment Plant, established in 1979, is located near Tukey's Bridge.

=== Transportation ===
==== Roads ====
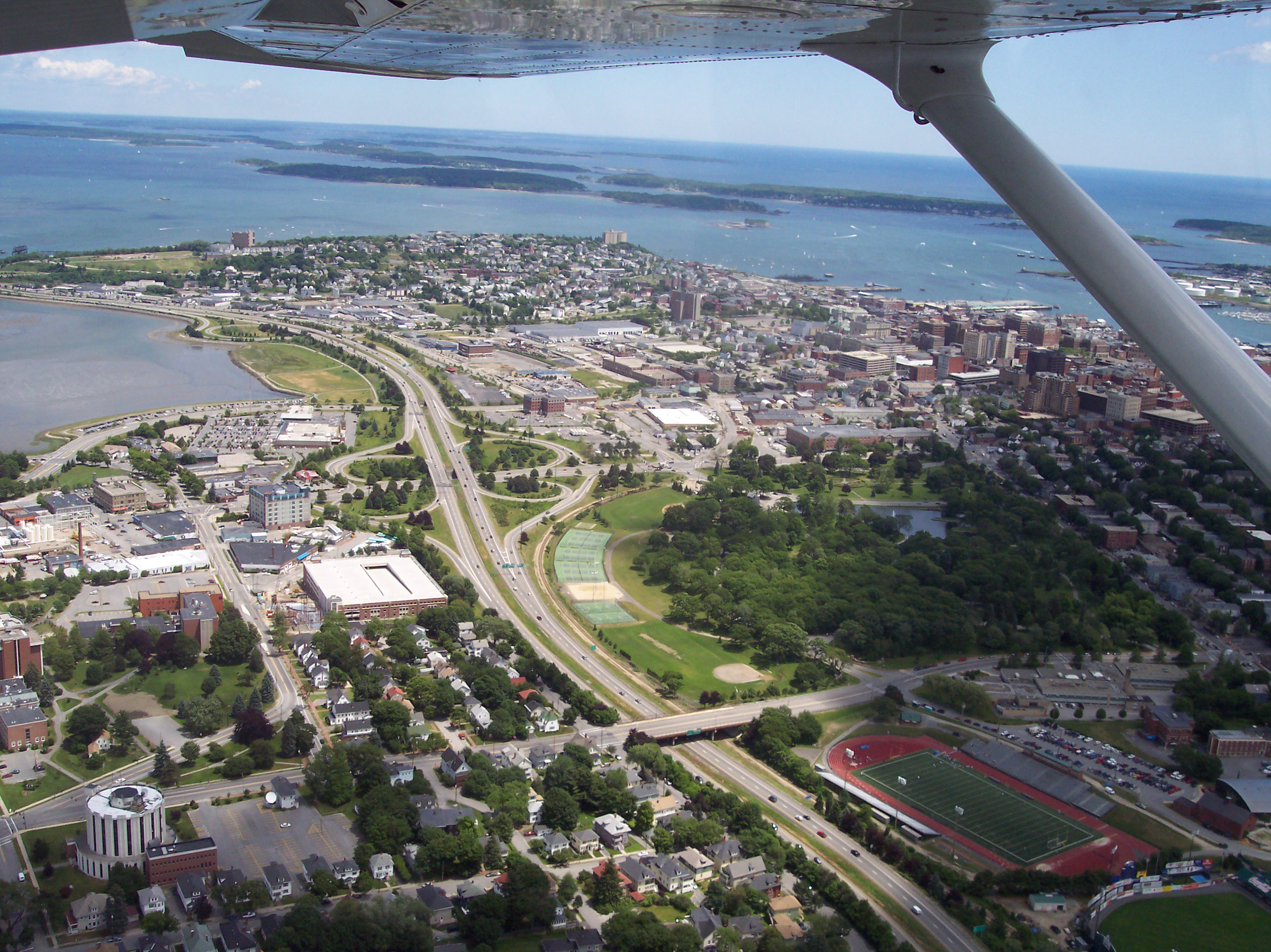
Portland from above, looking east along I-295

Portland is accessible from I-95 (the Maine Turnpike), I-295, and US 1. U.S. Route 302, a major travel route and scenic highway between Maine and Vermont, has its eastern terminus in Portland. State Routes include SR 9, SR 22, SR 25, SR 26, SR 77, and SR 100. SR 25 Business goes through southwestern Portland.

==== Intercity buses and trains ====
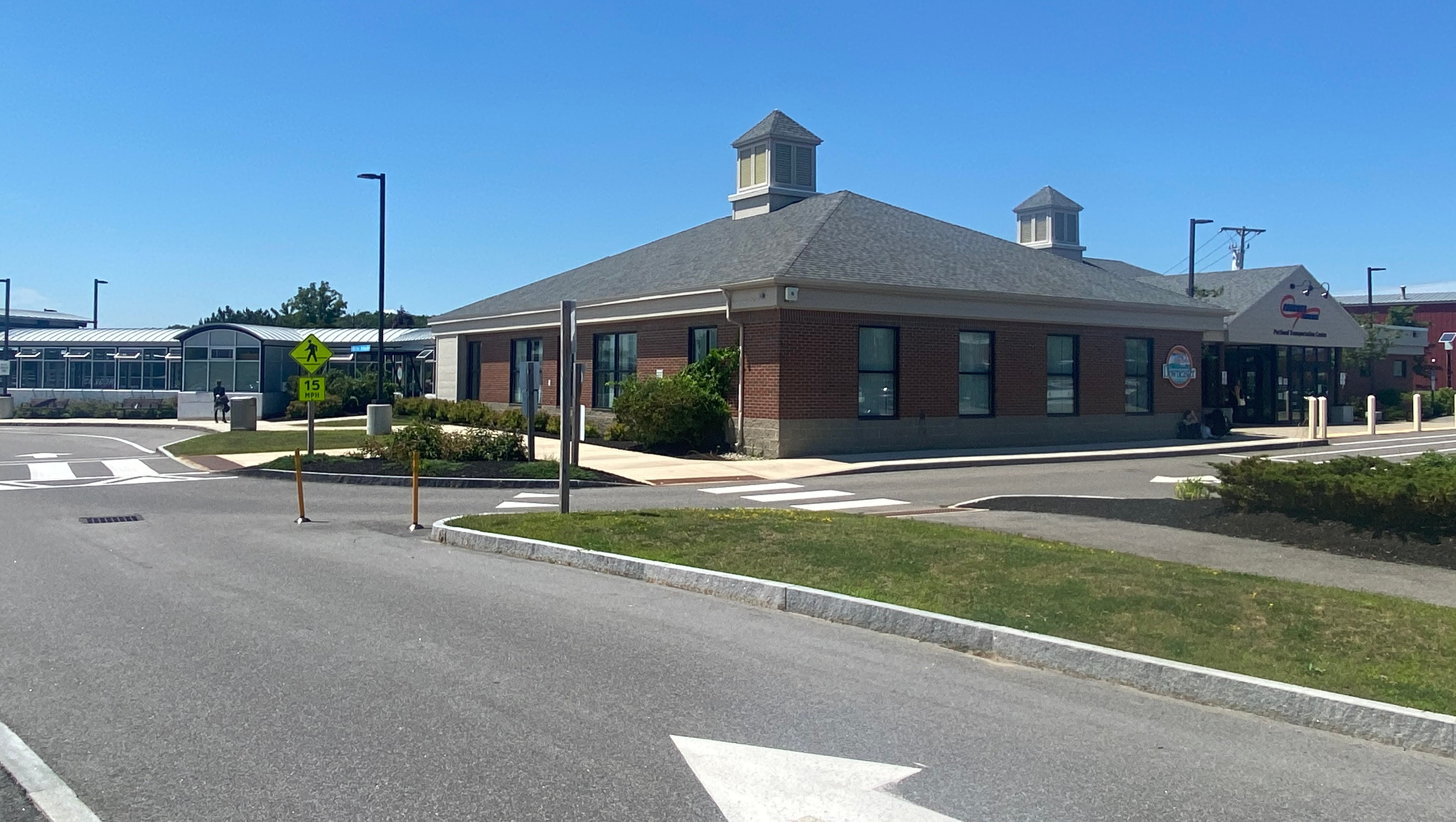
Portland Transportation Center

Amtrak's Downeaster service offers five daily trains connecting the city's station with eight towns and cities to the south, ending at Boston's North Station. Trains also serve to Freeport and Brunswick to the north.

Concord Coach Lines bus service connects Portland to 14 other communities in Maine as well as to Boston's South Station and Logan Airport. Both the Downeaster and the Concord Coach Lines depart from Portland Transportation Center on Thompsons Point Road, in the Libbytown neighborhood.

==== Local bus service ====
Local bus transit is provided by Greater Portland Metro with connections to Biddeford Saco Old Orchard Beach Transit.

==== Airports ====
Commercial air service is available at the Portland International Jetport (PWM), located in Stroudwater, west of the city's downtown district. American, Southwest, JetBlue, Breeze Airways, Sun Country, Delta, and United Airlines service the airport. Direct flights are available to Atlanta, Baltimore, Charlotte, Chicago, Detroit, Denver, Minneapolis, Orlando, Philadelphia, New York, Newark, Raleigh-Durham, Sarasota, and Washington, D.C.

==== Water transportation ====
The Port of Portland is the second-largest cruise and passenger destination in the state (next to Bar Harbor) and is served by the Ocean Gateway International Marine Passenger Terminal. Ferry service is available year-round to many destinations in Casco Bay. From 2006 to 2009, Bay Ferries operated a high speed ferry called The Cat featuring a five-hour trip to Yarmouth, Nova Scotia, for summer passengers and cars. In years past the Scotia Prince Cruises trip took eleven hours. A proposal to replace the defunct Nova Scotia ferry service was rejected in 2013 by the province. From May 15, 2014, until October 2015, the cruise ship ferry Nova Star made daily trips to Yarmouth, Nova Scotia. Due to poor passenger numbers and financial problems, Nova Scotia selected Bay Ferries, the prior operator of The Cat, to operate the service starting in 2016, citing the company's experience and industry relationships. Nova Star officials pledged a smooth transition to the new operator. The Nova Star was later ordered seized by federal marshals for nonpayment of bills.

Bay Ferries announced on March 24, 2016, the charter of the former Hawaii Superferry boat HST-2 from the US Navy for the Portland-Yarmouth service for two years. Bay Ferries signed a ten-year deal with Nova Scotia to run the ferry route, which will take about five and a half hours each way. They stated that the boat would be renamed The Cat and that service would begin around June 15, after refitting in South Carolina. There is still a dispute as to whether the ferry will be permitted to carry trucks, desired by Nova Scotia businesses but opposed by the City of Portland.

The Casco Bay Lines operate several passenger ferries with dozens of trips every day year-round to the major populated islands of Casco Bay. The service to Peaks Island also provides an auto ferry for most of its schedule.

== Sister cities ==
Portland's sister cities are:

- Arkhangelsk, Russia
- Cap-Haïtien, Haiti
- Garissa Township, Kenya
- Mytilene, Greece
- Shinagawa, Japan

== See also ==
- Mayor of Portland, Maine
- USS Portland (LSD-37)
