= Baxter Academy for Technology and Science =

High school in the United States

Coordinates: 43.6605°N 70.2620°W

- 185 Lancaster St, Portland, Maine; United States

Information
- Type: High school
- Established: August 2013
- Director: Anna Marie Klein-Christie
- Principals: Cicy Po & Alex Waters (???-2025) Jessica Ward & Paul Santamore (2026-Present)
- Grades: 9–12
- Enrollment: 416 Students
- Website: baxter-academy.org

Baxter Academy for Technology and Science is a public charter school serving grades 9–12 located in Portland, Maine. Established in 2013, it is Maine's third charter school. The school is in an urban setting and specializes in STEM (science, technology, engineering, and mathematics) curriculum. Its first senior class graduated in June 2016.

Baxter Academy is a college-preparatory high school, promoting student ownership of learning through curriculum focused specifically on science, technology, engineering and math (STEM). Baxter Academy students study complex, real-world problems, using and building technological tools in a collaborative environment with scientists, engineers and other professionals.

Baxter Academy's student and faculty bodies travel from nearly 60 towns across Southern, Central, and Western Maine to access school each day. A local bus company runs five express school bus routes to serve students with longer commutes. The Greater Portland Metro Bus system is another common way for Baxter students to access both the school itself and Downtown Portland as a whole.

The school also showcases its uniqueness by allowing more individual freedom and self guidance to help students prepare for the real world. One major way this is achieved is by allowing students to go off campus during lunch and become participating members of Portland's economy by shopping and dining during this time. The school also has a unique program known as "Flex Friday", where students or groups of students can organize a long-term project (1–4 years) that relates to their interests and goals while also containing educational value. The Projects are worked on every Friday, all day, when school is in session. Popular projects include software development, robotics, and internships.

On March 13, 2020, the school closed its doors amid COVID-19 concerns and increased logistical tension, and switched to a remote learning model. This model was followed throughout the entirety of the 2020–2021 school year, even as many other schools in the area began to reopen and new administrators were appointed. On August 1, 2021, an E-mail was sent to students and staff confirming that the school would return to in-person instruction by September 2021, but with additional COVID-19 Prevention methods in order to ensure campus safety. Fully in-person graduation ceremonies took place for the classes of 2022 and 2023.

Under the leadership of Executive Director Anna Klein-Christie, Baxter Academy has leaned into its vision of preparing students for the "real world" through extensive internships and collaboration with local industry, nonprofits, and government. It leads in academic testing across all subject areas, maintains a nearly 100% graduation rate, and celebrates over 90% college acceptance rate.
