= Casco Bay Weekly =

The Casco Bay Weekly was a free alternative newspaper published weekly in Portland, Maine, from May 26, 1988, to 2004. It was similar to other alternative newspapers such as The Village Voice and The Phoenix.

In 1990, Dodge Morgan, who also owned the Maine Times newspaper, purchased Casco Bay Weekly from Mogul Media Inc. At the time, CBW had a circulation of approximately 20,000 entirely in the Greater Portland area. The paper struggled with declining ad revenues after the establishment of another alternative newspaper, the Portland Phoenix, in 1999.

The paper's final editor, Chris Busby, founded The Bollard in 2005.

The paper's archives are held at the Portland Public Library and are available online at the library's website.
