= Duckfat =

Small restaurant in Portland, Maine

Duckfat is a small restaurant and alternative sandwich shop in Portland, Maine. Located at 43 Middle Street in the Old Port neighborhood, the restaurant was opened in 2005 by Rob Evans, a local chef. Evans also owns a nearby restaurant named Hugo's. The name derives from the main menu item of Belgian french fries twice cooked in duckfat. In 2004, the restaurant's tuna melt sandwich was named one of the top sandwiches in the United States by Esquire.
