= Stevens Avenue =

Street in Portland, Maine

Coordinates: 43.67349°N 70.29526°W

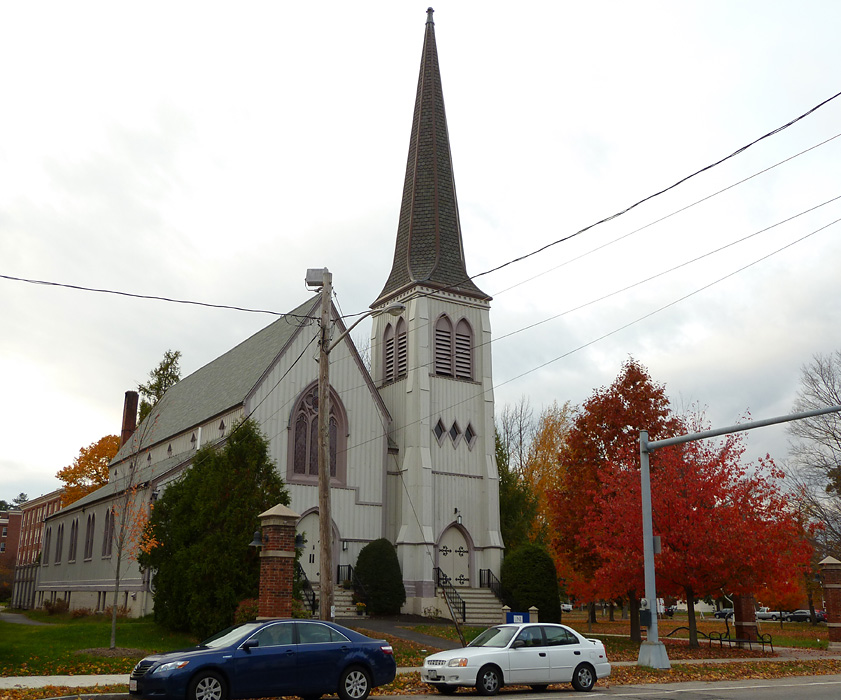
- Ludcke Auditorium, part of the University of New England's Portland campus, on Stevens Avenue
- Interactive map of Stevens Avenue
- Part of: SR 9
- Namesake: Isaac Sawyer Stevens
- Length: 2 mi (3.2 km)
- Location: Portland, Maine, U.S.
- North end: Forest Avenue
- South end: Congress Street

Stevens Avenue (known colloquially as Stevens Ave) is a major street in the Deering neighborhood of Portland, Maine, United States. Part of Maine State Route 9 from Woodford Street southward, it runs for around 2 miles (3.2 km) from Forest Avenue, at Morrills Corner, in the north to Outer Congress Street in the south. Stevens Avenue passes to the west of Woodfords Corner. Between Morrills Corner and Woodfords Corner, Stevens Avenue is linked to Forest Avenue by several side streets.

Several notable buildings stand on Stevens Avenue, including Stevens Avenue Armory, the University of New England's Portland campus, Evergreen Cemetery and Baxter Woods.

The street passes through Westbrook College Historic District, which was placed on the National Register of Historic Places in 1977.

Stevens Avenue is named for Isaac Sawyer Stevens (1748–1820), who built a home at 628 Stevens Avenue in 1767. It was demolished in 1947.

== Intersections ==
Stevens Avenue intersects with several major streets (from north to south):

- Forest Avenue (U.S. Route 302)
- Woodford Street (from which it takes on/rescinds the Maine State Route 9 designation)
- Brighton Avenue (Maine State Route 25)
- Congress Street (Maine State Route 22)

== Notable addresses ==
From north to south:

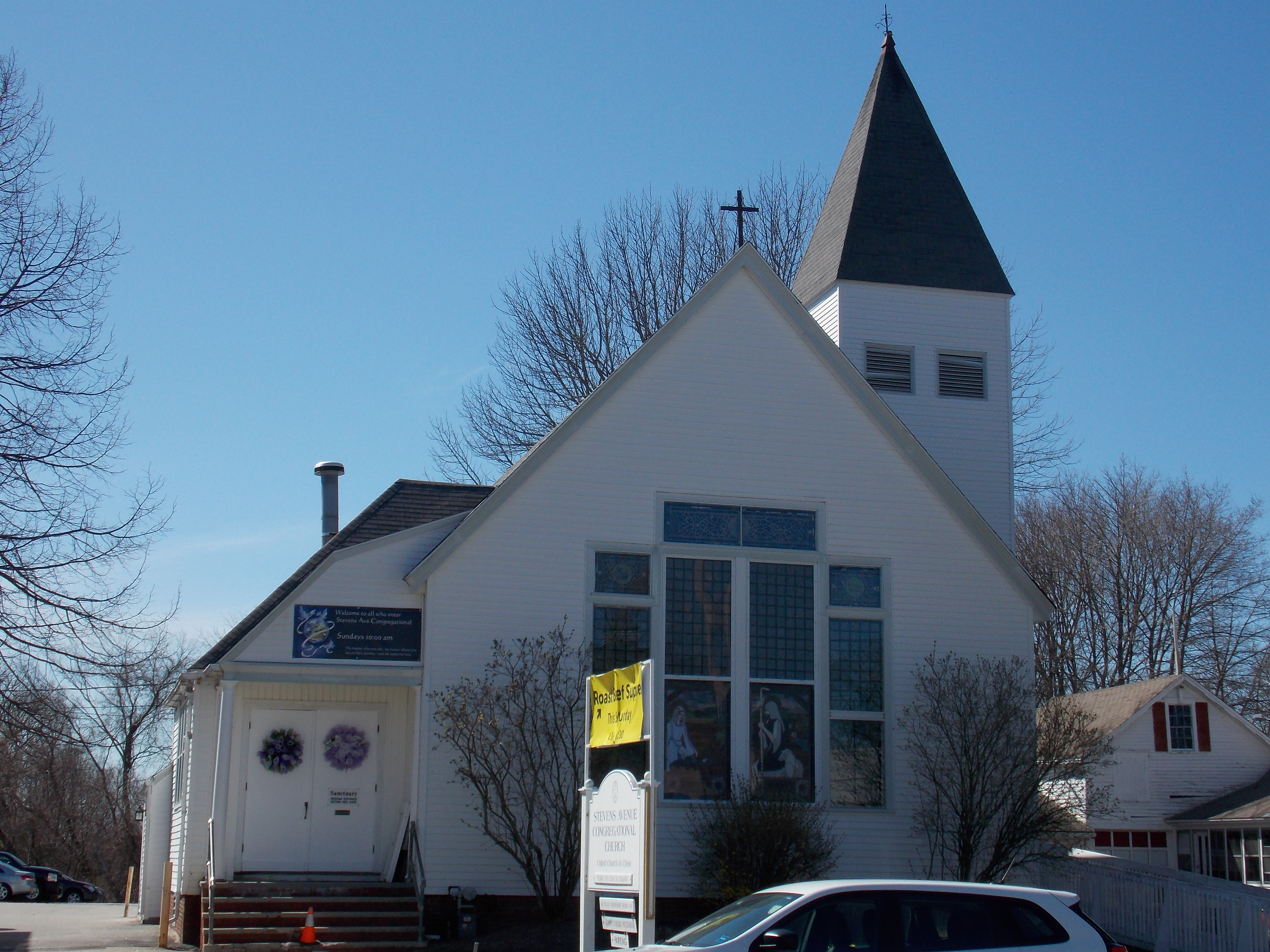
Stevens Avenue Congregational Church (2016)

Western side

- Stevens Avenue Congregational Church, 790 Stevens Avenue (built in 1888)
- Stevens Avenue Armory, 772 Stevens Avenue (built in 1908)
- University of New England, 716 Stevens Avenue (established in 1831 as Westbrook College)
- Ludcke Auditorium, 710 Stevens Avenue (built in 1867)
- Evergreen Cemetery, 672 Stevens Avenue (established in 1855)
- Lincoln Middle School, 522 Stevens Avenue (built in 1899)
- Roy's Shoe Shop, 500 Stevens Avenue (established in 1929)
- Pat's Meat Market, 484 Stevens Avenue (established in 1917)
- Longfellow Elementary School, 432 Stevens Avenue (built in 1952)
- Deering High School, 370 Stevens Avenue (built in 1874)

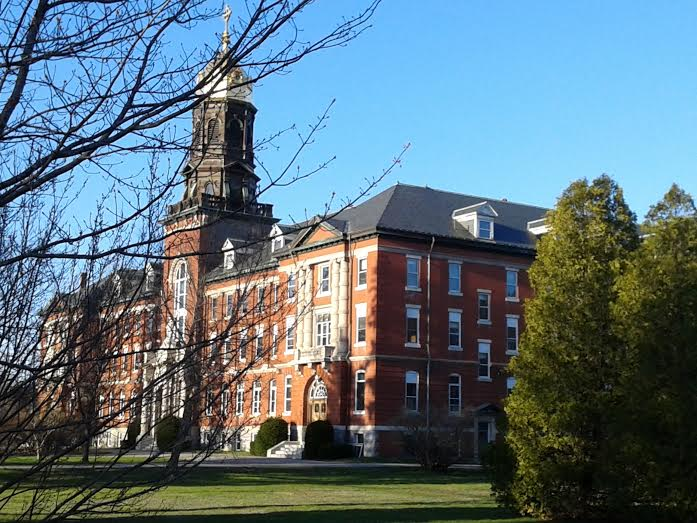
St. Joseph's Convent (2016)

Eastern side

- St. Joseph's Catholic Church, 673 Stevens Avenue (built in 1931)
- St. Joseph's Convent, 605 Stevens Avenue (built in 1909)
- Baxter Woods, 555 Stevens Avenue (established in 1946)

== Public transportation ==
Stevens Avenue is served by Greater Portland Metro's routes 9A and 9B. The 9A runs in a clockwise direction from downtown Portland; the 9B counterclockwise.

== See also ==
- Portland Railroad Company
