= 415 Cumberland Avenue =

Historic building in Portland, Maine

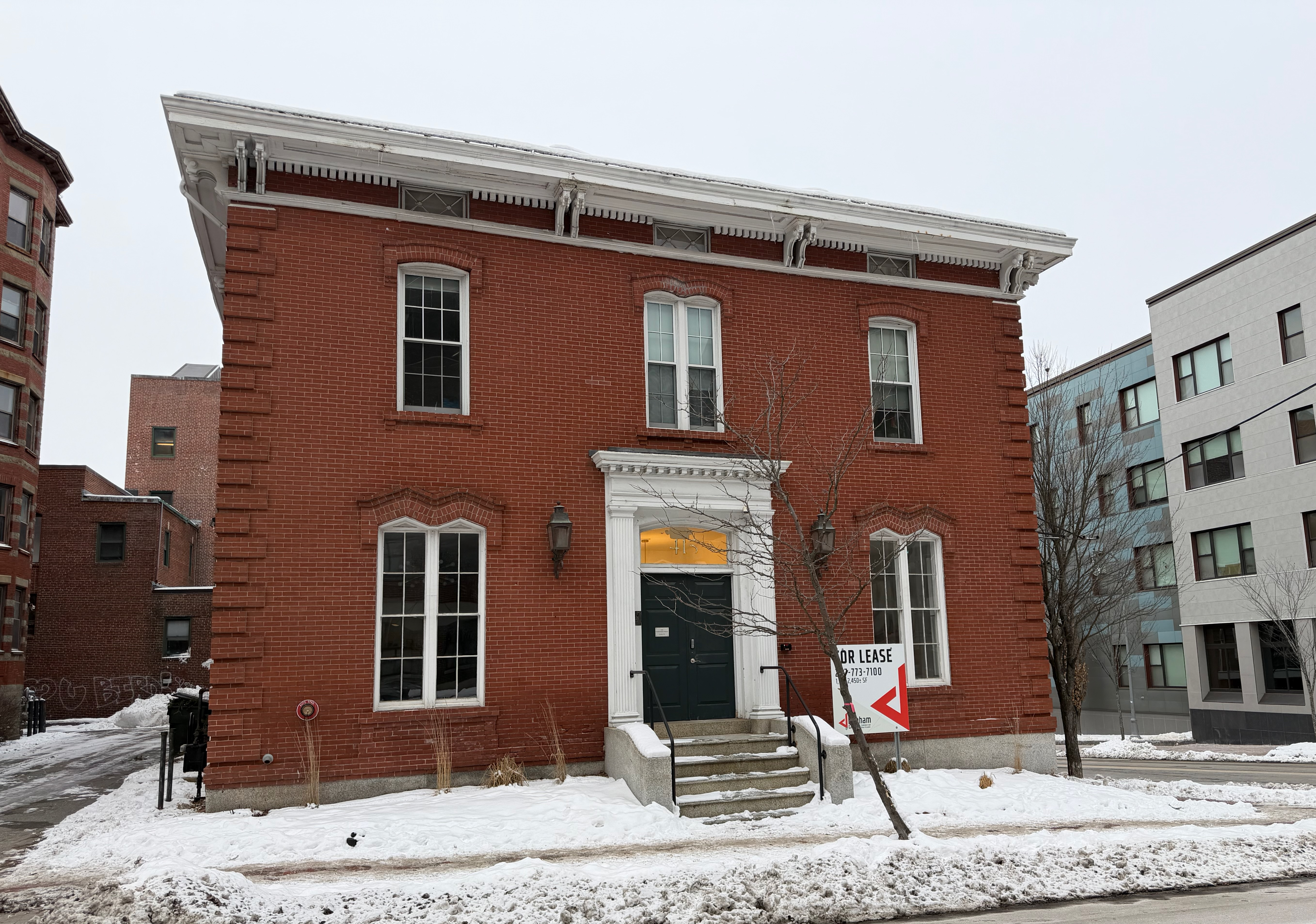
- The building in 2026
- Interactive map of the 415 Cumberland Avenue area

General information
- Architectural style: Federal
- Location: Portland, Maine, U.S., 415 Cumberland Avenue
- Coordinates: 43.656224°N 70.264883°W
- Completed: 1880 (146 years ago)

Technical details
- Floor count: 2

The building at 415 Cumberland Avenue in Portland, Maine, United States, was constructed in 1880. It once served as the city's busiest post office, Station A.

== History ==
Originally a home, it was owned by businessman Albert S. Rines (1848–1924), an uncle of local hotelier Henry P. Rines (1885–1939). It was later selected as a post office location, a block away from Congress Street, because it would benefit "the advance of business houses to the westward of our city."

In December 1921, the Eastern Argus reported that the building's role as a post office had a begun. It served in that capacity until 1934. Its manager was Louis W. Melaugh.

Portland's main post office at the time was on the site of today's Post Office Park in the heart of the Old Port. The building was constructed after the city's great fire of 1866. Today's main post office of Portland was built in 1932 on Forest Avenue, near Deering Oaks Park.

In 1923, a year before his death, Albert S. Rines conveyed the lot to the Young Men's Christian Association.

A small addition was made to the building's Forest Avenue elevation in the 20th century, during which period it was also a showroom for Thos. Moser furniture.
