= Portland–Lewiston Interurban =

Transport company

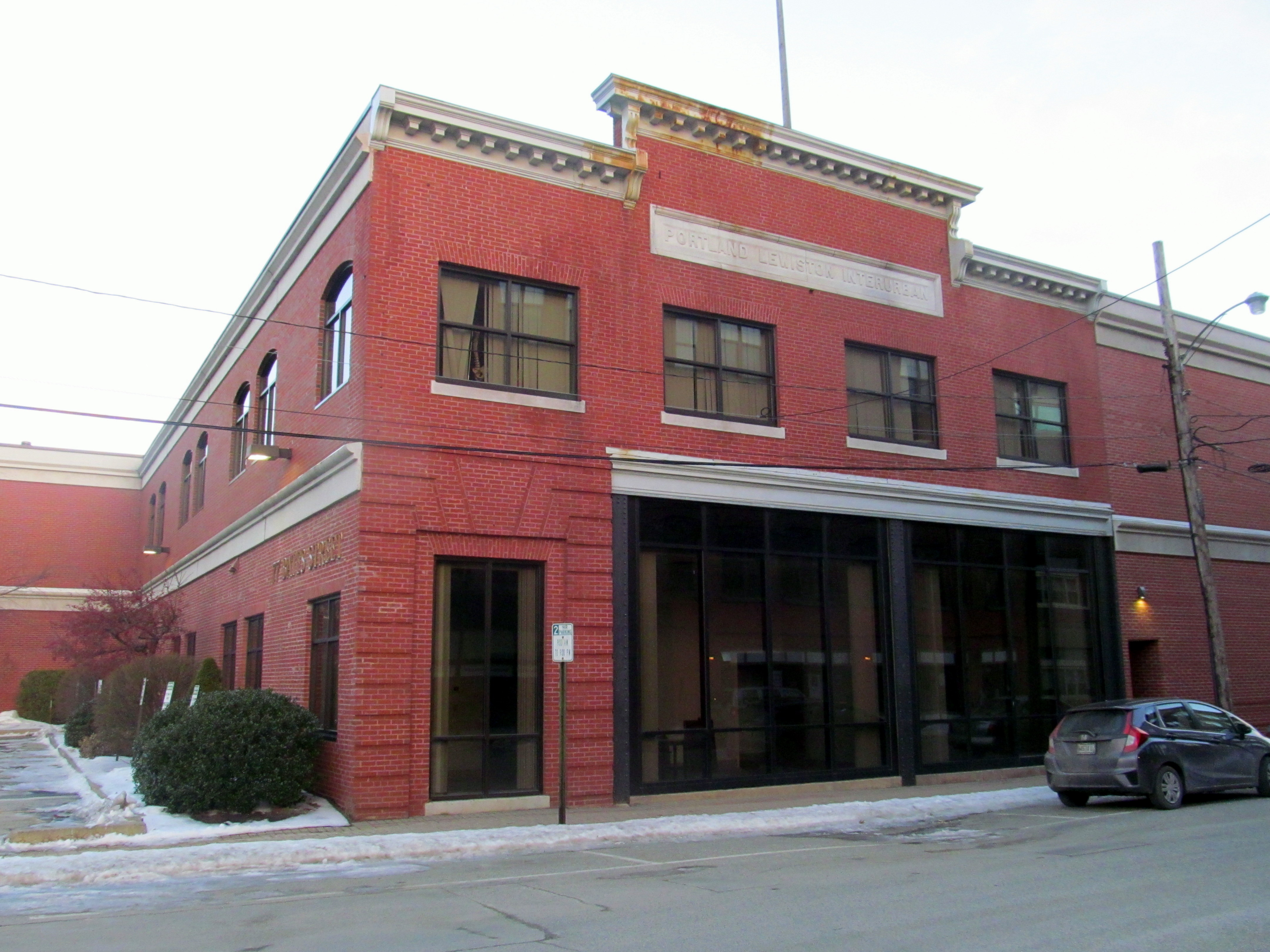
- The former Lewiston Terminal, photographed in 2017

Overview
- Locale: Maine
- Dates of operation: 1914–1933
- Successor: abandoned

Technical
- Track gauge: 4 ft 8 1/2 in (1,435 mm) standard gauge
- Electrification: 650-volt DC
- Length: 40 miles (64 km)

The Portland–Lewiston Interurban (PLI) was an electric railroad subsidiary of the Androscoggin Electric Company operating from 1914 to 1933 between Monument Square in Portland and Union Square in Lewiston, Maine. Hourly service was offered over the 40-mile (64 km) route between the two cities. Express trains stopping only at West Falmouth, Gray, New Gloucester, Upper Gloucester and Danville made the trip in 80 minutes, while trains making other local stops upon request required 20 minutes more. The line was considered the finest interurban railroad in the state of Maine.

== Route and facilities ==
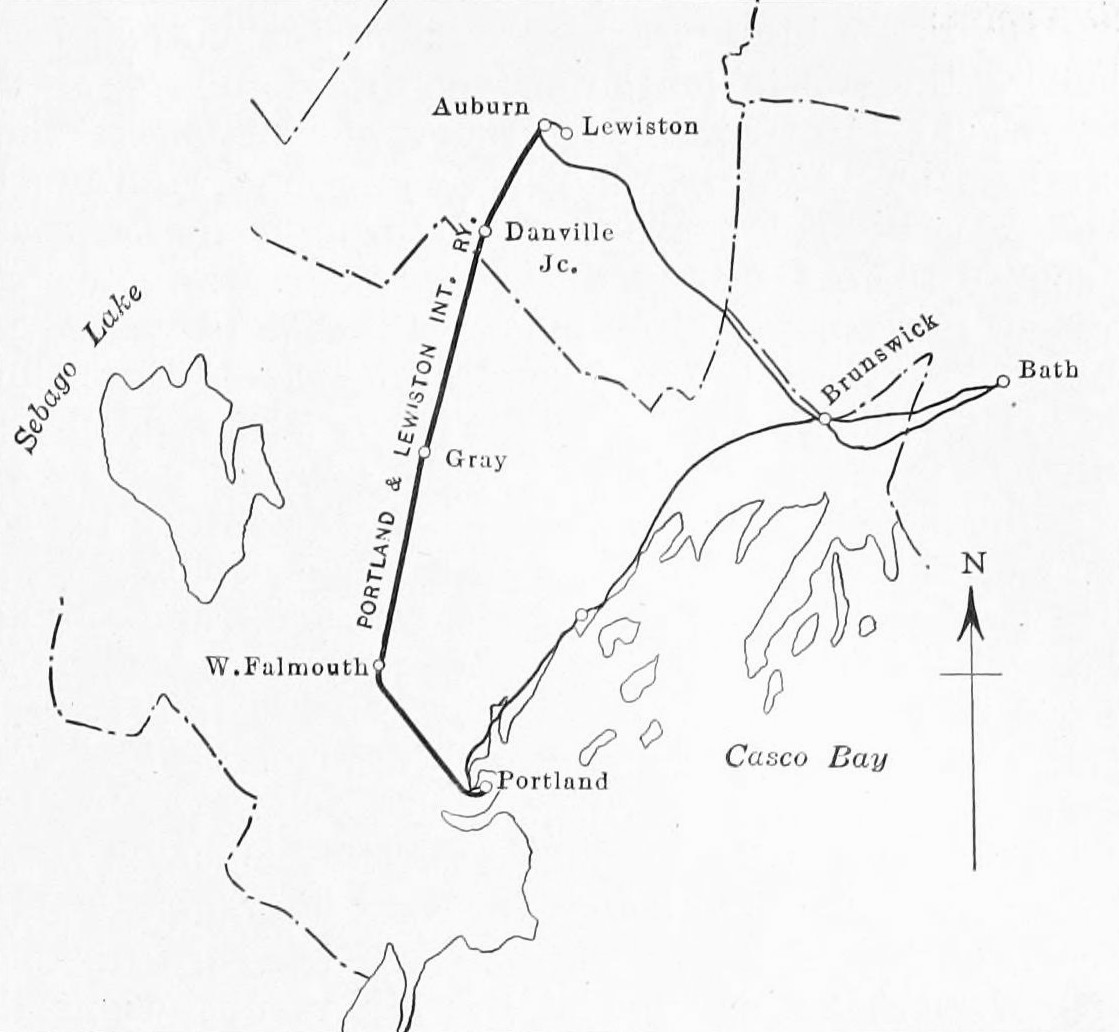
1915 map of the Portland–Lewiston Interurban and connecting lines

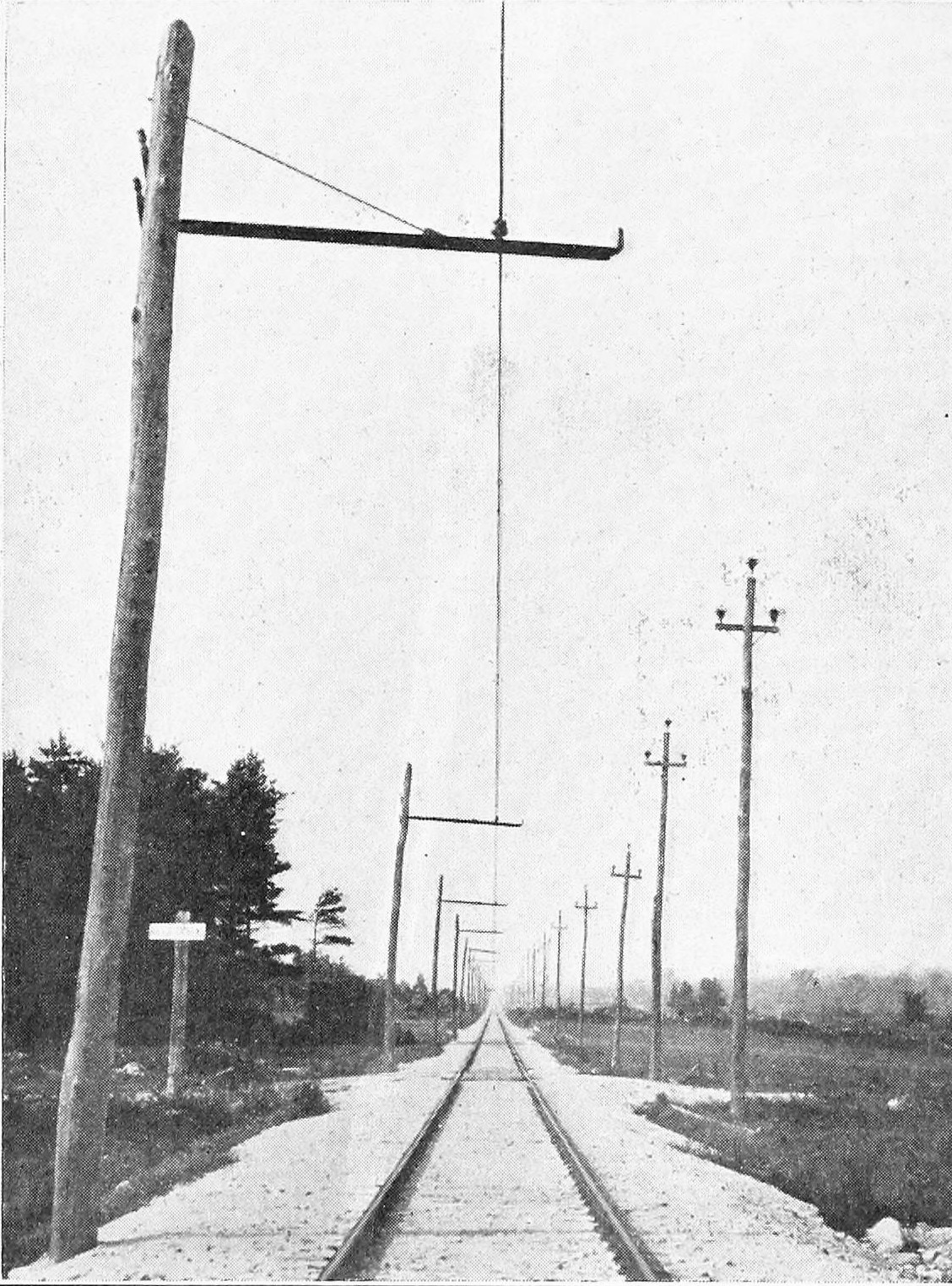
Typical tangent track on the line

Summer-season construction began in 1910 including ten reinforced concrete bridges. The longest was a 200-foot (61 m) span over the Presumpscot River There was a 100-foot (30 m) span over the Little Androscoggin River in Auburn and a span of similar length near West Falmouth. Approximately 30 miles (48 km) of 70-pound (32 kg) steel rail was laid in 33-foot (10 m) lengths over private right-of-way connecting segments of trackage rights over Portland, Lewiston, and Auburn city streetcar lines. Scheduled interurban service began on 7 July 1914. At Gray, odd-numbered northbound trains took a siding to cross even-numbered southbound trains on the following route from north to south:

- Lewiston 210 feet (64 m) by 75 feet (23 m) brick passenger terminal and 4-track car barn and repair shop on Middle Street
- Fairview Junction with the Auburn streetcar line
- Sadler's siding
- Little Androscoggin River bridge
- Littlefield's Corner crossing of the Grand Trunk Lewiston branch
- bridge over the Maine Central Rumford branch
- Grand Trunk Railway underpass
- Danville siding with combined power substation and passenger shelter
- Upper Gloucester freight platform
- Rowes siding
- New Gloucester
- Penny Road freight shed
- Morse Road freight shed
- Webster's siding
- North Gray freight platform
- Hawkes freight platform
- Gray car storage yard with car barn, freight house, and combined power substation and passenger shelter
- Forest Lake siding (South Gray)
- West Cumberland
- Morrison's Hill gravel pit
- West Falmouth siding with combined power substation and passenger shelter
- Presumpscot River bridge
- Deering Siding for delivery of construction materials, but Maine Central Railroad refused to interchange loaded cars.
- Deering Junction (Morrills Corner) with the Portland streetcar line
- Portland 210 feet (64 m) by 75 feet (23 m) 4-track brick car barn between Cumberland Avenue and Portland Street

== Rolling stock ==
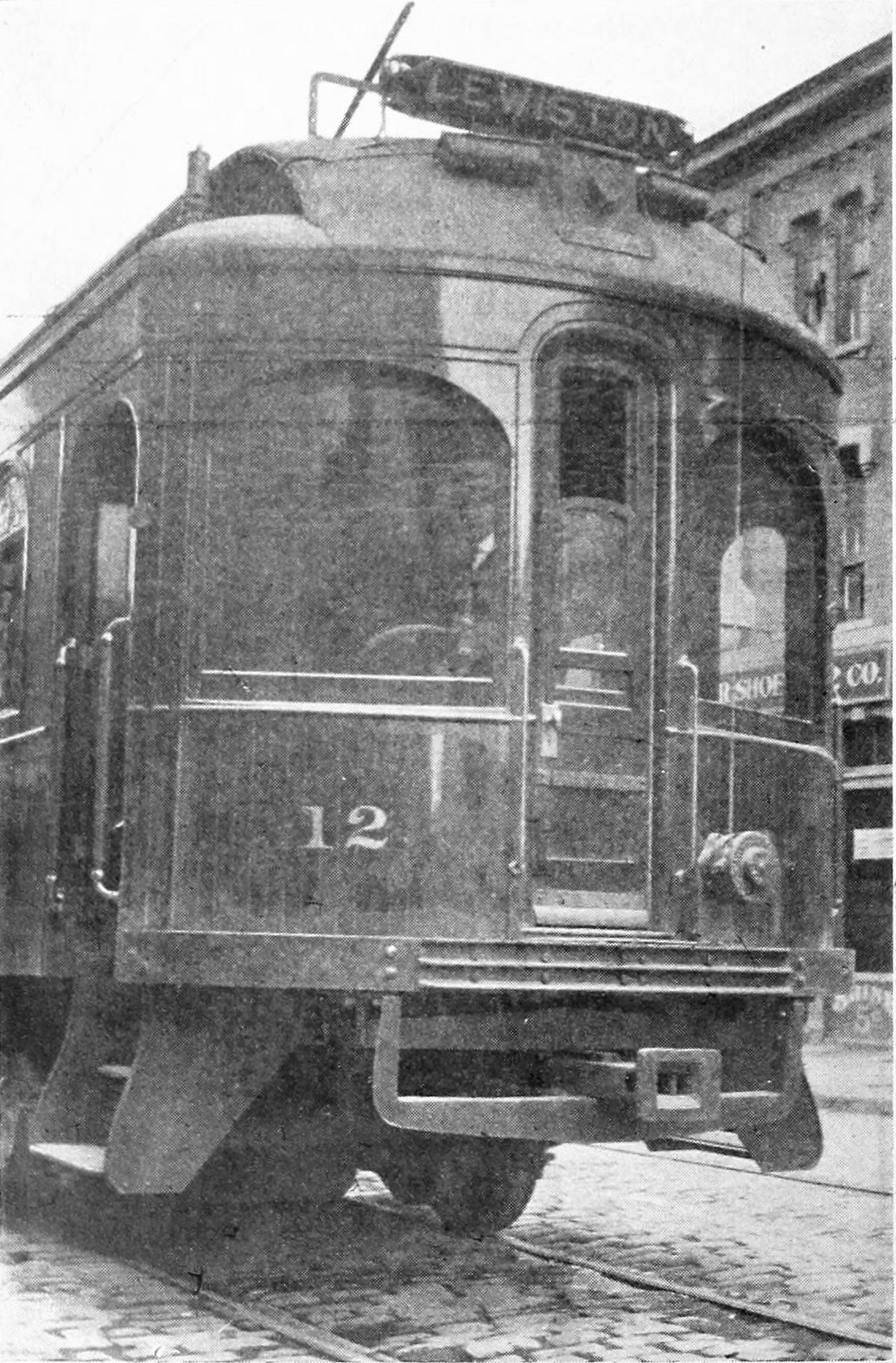
Car #12, the Gladiolus, in 1915

The four original Laconia Car Company interurban cars were 46 feet (14 m) long with an enclosed vestibule at either end. Each car contained a 6-foot (1.8 m) smoking compartment with longitudinal leather seats, and a 30-foot (9.1 m) compartment with twenty plush cross-seats for non-smoking passengers. Cars were equipped with two trolley poles for operation in either direction. Each axle of the two-truck cars was equipped with a 90 horsepower (67 kW) motor geared for a top speed of 59 miles (95 km) per hour. Although cars were capable of multiple-unit operation, difficulties running on municipal streetcar tracks discourages the practice.

Two more coaches without separate smoking compartments were purchased in 1915. These coaches had less powerful 75 horsepower (56 kW) traction motors and were incapable of the speed required for express service. They were used exclusively for the slower schedules making local stops. Powered box express cars operated as extra trains making two round trips daily handling less than carload freight including cans of raw milk from rural dairy farms to a Portland milk processor. The Baldwin electric locomotive ran on these extra runs with a PLI boxcar when there were a few PLI stock cars of cattle or bulky loads for PLI's ten flatcars.

=== Powered rolling stock roster ===
Number	Name	Builder	Type	Date	Notes
10	Arbutus	Laconia Car Company	Coach-Smoker	1912	
12	Gladiolus	Laconia Car Company	Coach-Smoker	1912	
14	Narcissus	Laconia Car Company	Coach-Smoker	1912	preserved at the Seashore Trolley Museum
16	Clematis	Laconia Car Company	Coach-Smoker	1912	
18	Azalea	Wason Manufacturing Company	Coach-Smoker	1912	
20	Magnolia	Wason Manufacturing Company	Coach-Smoker	1912	
22	Maine	Wason Manufacturing Company	Coach-Smoker	1920	
30		Laconia Car Company	Line car	1914	box express with a roof platform for maintenance service snowplows fitted seasonally
32		Laconia Car Company	Box Express	1915	snowplows fitted seasonally
34		G. C. Kuhlman Car Company	Box Express	1919	snowplows fitted seasonally
36		Laconia Car Company	Box Express		purchased from Lewiston, Augusta and Waterville street Railway snowplows fitted seasonally
40		Laconia Car Company	Coach	1915	leased to the Portland Railway 1916-1918
42		Laconia Car Company	Coach	1915	
90		Baldwin Locomotive Works	Motor	1912	snowplows fitted seasonally leased to the Portland Street Railway 1925-1933

== Power ==
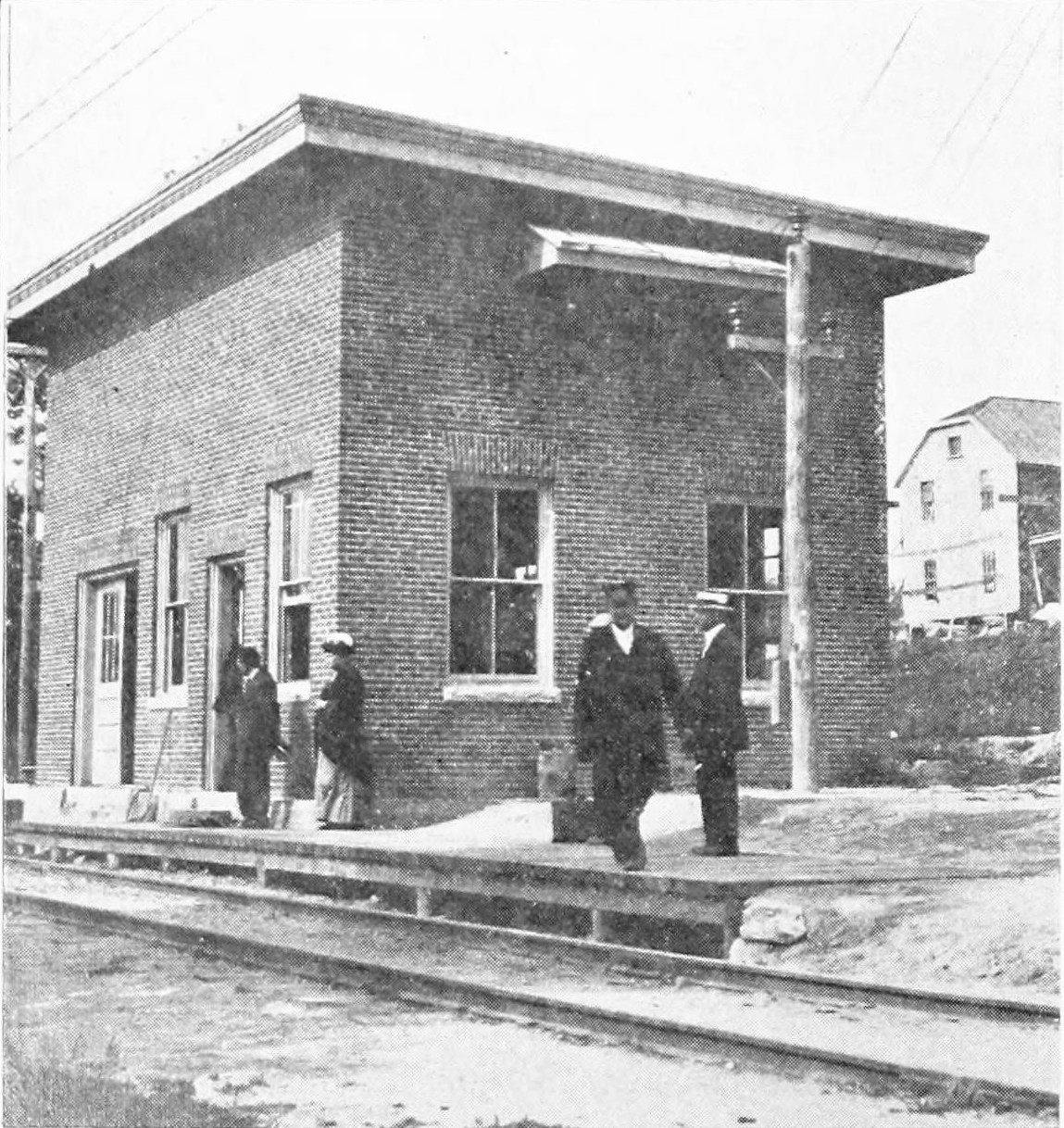
The combined substation and passenger station at Gray in 1915

Hydroelectricity provided by the Androscoggin Electric Company Deer Rips generators on the Androscoggin River could be supplemented by a steam power plant in Lewiston. Three-phase 60-cycle power was transmitted to the Danville substation over the 10,000-volt lines used for residential distribution in the Lewiston service area, and was boosted to 33,000 volts at Danville for more efficient transmission to the substations in Gray and Falmouth. Overhead catenary providing 650-volt DC was supported by wooden poles at intervals of 120 feet (37 m), and these poles carried a separate telephone wire allowing continuous communication between trains and headquarters.

== History ==
Service was interrupted during the spring of 1916 by snowmelt freshets causing extensive washouts between Gray and West Falmouth. Fifty dollars was stolen when the last daily train from Lewiston to Portland was robbed at Fairview Junction on 18 March 1917. Heavy snow collapsed the roof of the Gray car barn on 11 February 1918, but it was rebuilt. Express car 32 and Gladiolus suffered repairable minor damage in a slow head-on collision in Falmouth on 1 March 1918. Androscoggin Electric Company merged into Central Maine Power in 1919. The blizzard of 6 March 1920 caused cancellation of many Maine trains including the PLI cars. The Maine Statehood Centennial Exposition in Portland on 5 July 1920 created the PLI's heaviest daily passenger load. Coach-smoker Maine was purchased for the Exposition, and the box express cars were temporarily fitted with benches to carry all the passengers.

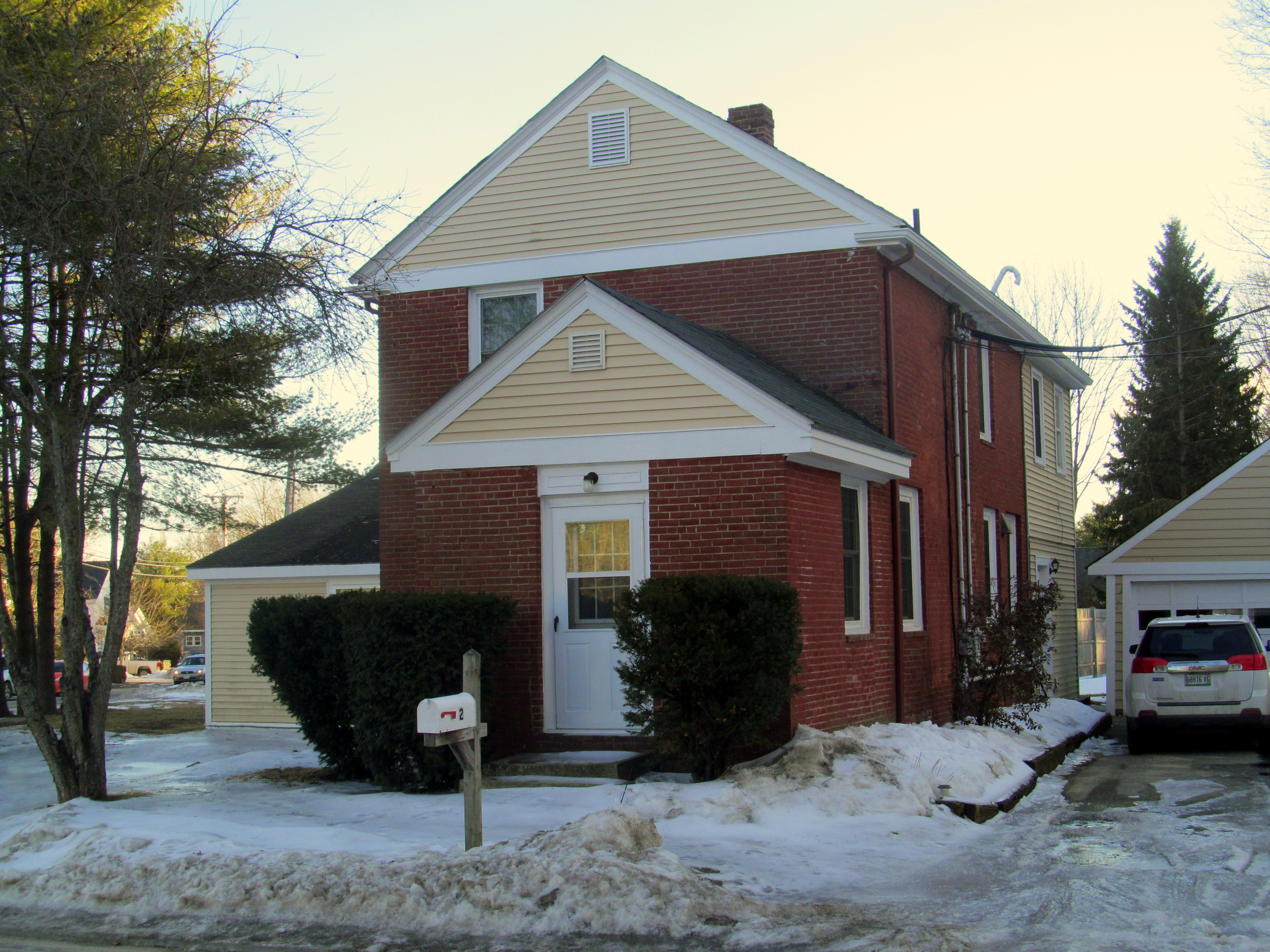
The former West Falmouth substation, converted to a private house, in 2017

Two extra cars carrying the Auburn high school basketball team and students to a Portland game collided at Deering Junction on 24 January 1924. The following Maine rammed the leading Azalea as it slowed in heavy fog. There were no serious injuries, but the game was cancelled and both cars required repairs. Although the other concrete bridges proved durable, the Presumpscot River bridge was weakened by paper mill waste and required replacement by a steel span in 1927. In September 1929 the competing Androscoggin and Kennebec (A&K) electric railway abandoned its parallel line south of Lewiston in favor of a trackage rights agreement with the PLI. When the A&K completely abandoned its service east of Lewiston to Augusta in July 1932, PLI made an agreement to transfer express at Lewiston to Hodgdon's Motor Express Company highway trucks for continued service to Augusta.

As increasing numbers of riders left PLI cars for automobiles through the 1920s and Great Depression, interurban service ended on 29 June 1933 and the rails were lifted in 1934. The Danville substation was retained by Central Maine Power Company, but the Gray and West Falmouth substations were sold as residential dwellings, and the Lewiston car barn was converted to a Red and White food store. Much of the right-of-way between Portland and West Falmouth was used for the Maine Turnpike; but a portion of the right-of-way through Gray was on planning to be restored for use by the Maine Narrow Gauge Railroad Museum, but those plans were since abandoned and the museum remains in Portland. The interurban car Narcissus has been preserved at the Seashore Trolley Museum.
