= Baxter Woods =

Park in Portland, Maine, United States

Coordinates: 43°40′37.6″N 70°17′15.6″W

Mayor Baxter Woods
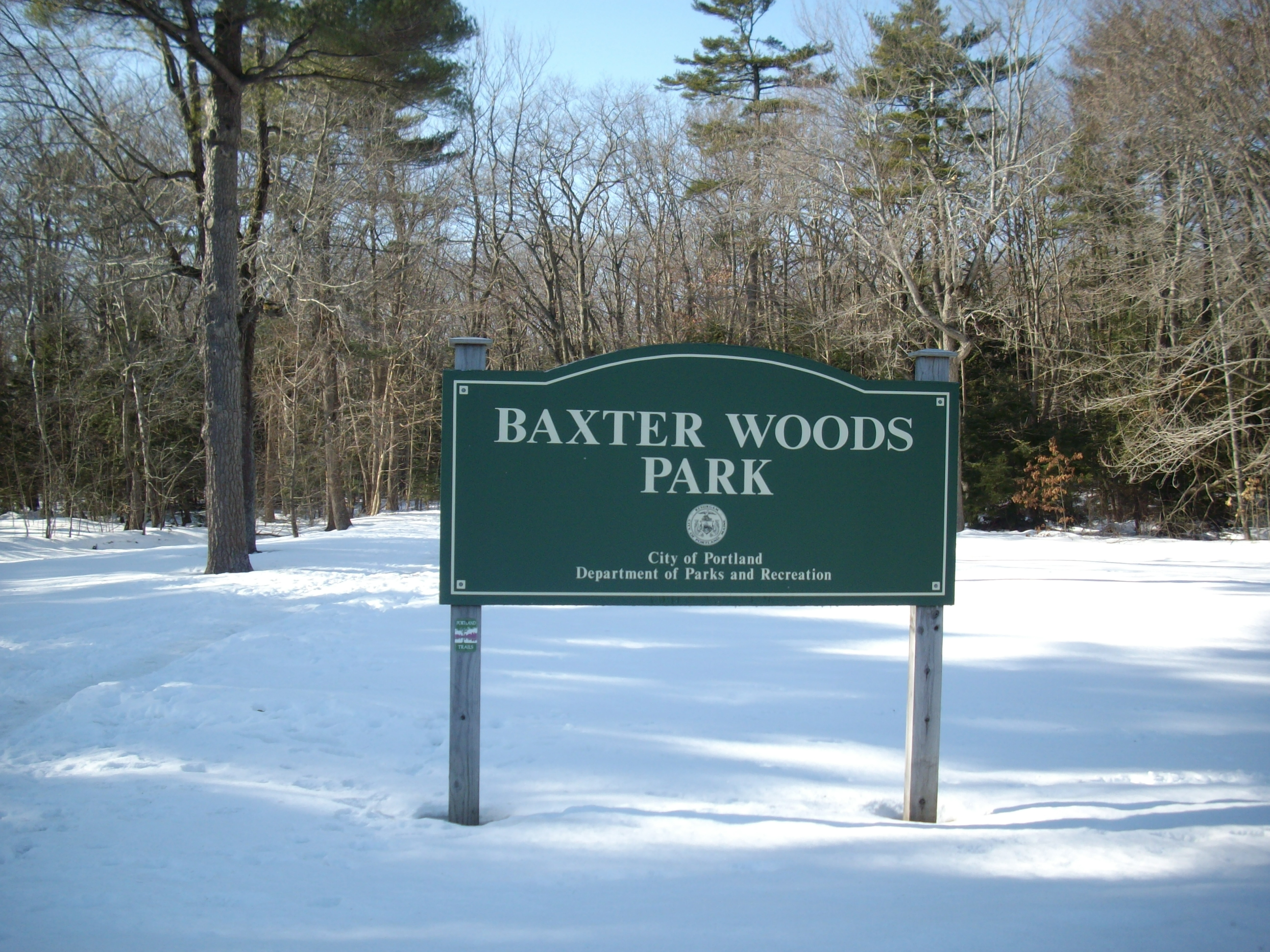
- Entrance to Baxter Woods from Forest Avenue
- Interactive map of Mayor Baxter Woods
- Type: Park
- Location: Portland, Maine, United States
- Area: 29 acres (12 ha)
- Operator: City of Portland, Maine
- Open: 1946
- Designation: Nature reserve and municipal forest

Mayor Baxter Woods Park is a nature reserve and municipal forest in the Deering Center neighborhood of Portland, Maine, United States. The land which became Baxter Woods was owned by Congressman Francis Ormand Jonathan Smith. He died in 1876 and his estate sold the forest to canning magnate, land developer, and future Mayor James Phinney Baxter in 1882. When J. P. Baxter died in 1921, it had not been developed during the preceding building boom and was bequeathed to his son Percival P. Baxter. In April 1946, Percival Baxter donated the land to the City of Portland on the condition that it would "...forever be retained and used by [the] City in trust for the benefit of the people of Portland as a Municipal Forest and Park and for public recreation and educational purposes". On June 19, 1956, U.S. Senator Frederick Payne mentioned the land in a speech honoring Percival Baxter, calling the land a "beautiful nature sanctuary given by you in honor of your father..."

Covering 29 acres (120,000 m^{2}), Baxter Woods is the largest undisturbed forested area in the city. The park is bordered by major roads Stevens Avenue to its east and Forest Avenue to its west. Its trail connects to Evergreen Cemetery and is also close to Baxter Boulevard.
