= Chauncey Woodford =

Early settler of Portland, Maine

- Born: 1783
- Died: August 24, 1841 (aged 57–58)
- Resting place: Bailey Cemetery, Portland, Maine, U.S.
- Occupation: Merchant
- Spouse: Lucy Stevens (1799–1841; his death)

Chauncey Woodford (1783 – August 25, 1841) was a merchant and an early settler of Deering, Maine. Portland's Woodfords Corner is now named for him and his brothers, Ebenezer and Isaiah.

== Early life ==
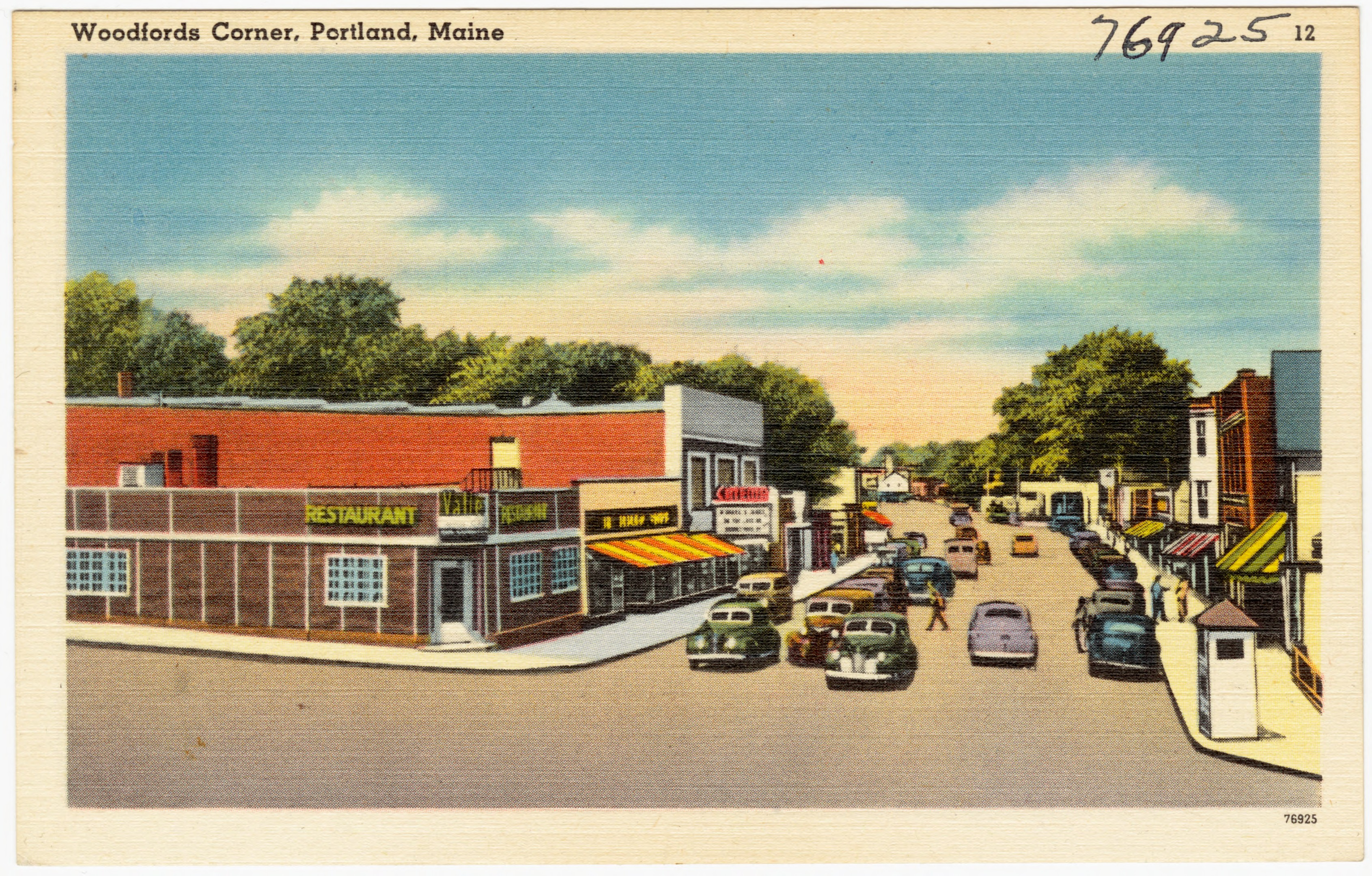
A postcard, dated between 1930 and 1945, showing a northwestern view of Woodfords Corner, with Forest Avenue being crossed by Woodford Avenue

Woodford grew up in Connecticut. He was one of three known sons in his family, and his two brothers soon followed him to Maine. He was a maker of horn combs, and sold his product in large quantities to customers in Boston, New York City and Philadelphia.

Aged around sixteen, Woodford settled in what is Deering (now Portland), Maine, at the intersection of what is now Woodford Street and Forest Avenue. The corner developed as part of a major route from the Portland peninsula inland to the northwest. It is at the convergence of four neighborhoods: Back Cove, Oakdale, Deering Center and Rosemont. Forest Avenue is part of U.S. Route 302 today.

== Personal life ==
On November 28, 1799, Woodford married Lucy Stevens.

== Death ==
Woodford died in 1841, aged 57 or 58. He was interred in Portland's Bailey Cemetery. His wife survived him by thirteen years, and was buried beside him.
