= Morrills Corner =

Road intersection in Portland, Maine, U.S.

- Neighborhood in Portland, Maine
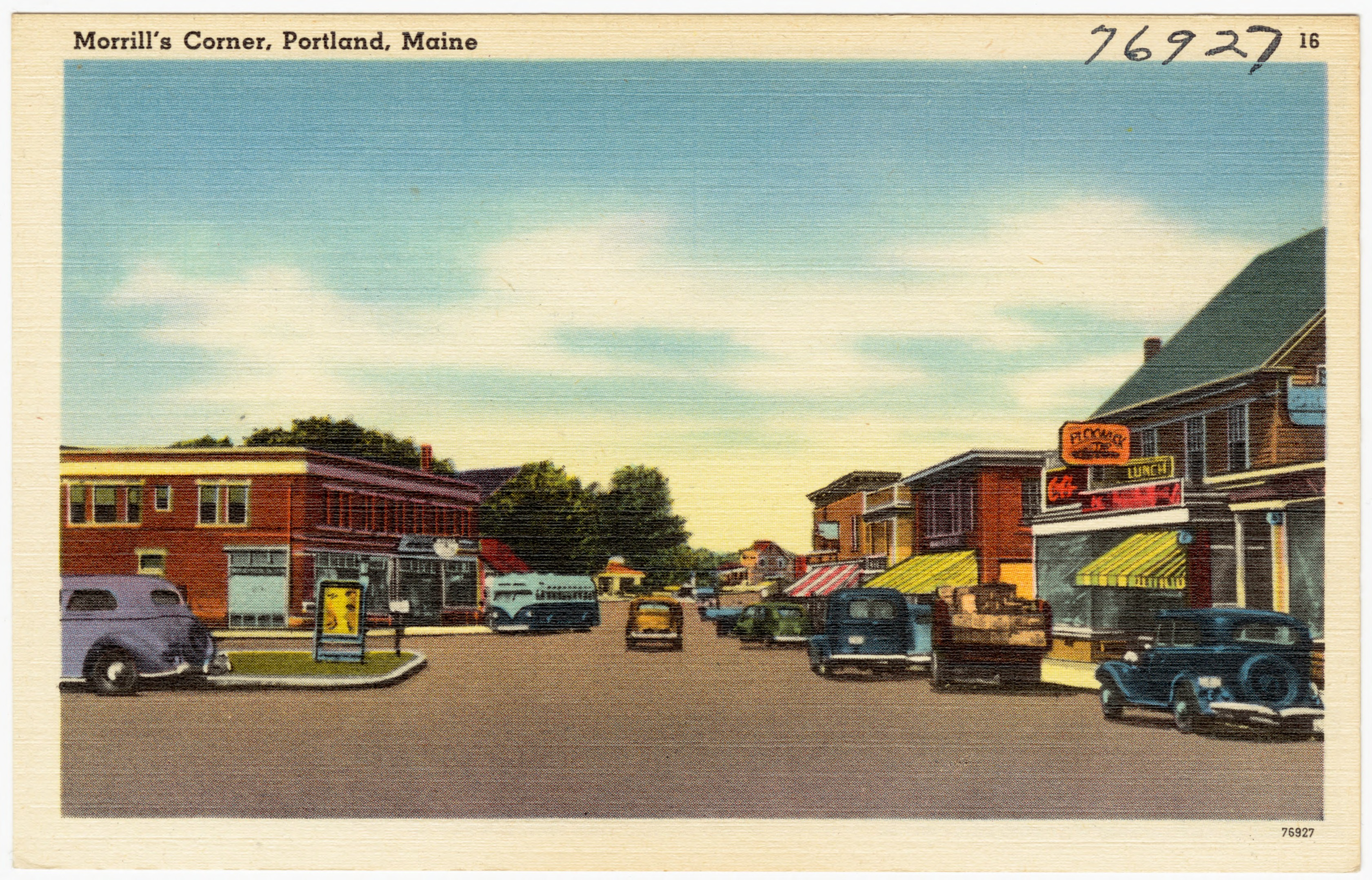
- A c. 1940 view, looking north from Forest Avenue toward its intersection with Allen Avenue
- Location in Portland, Maine
- Coordinates: 43.688320°N 70.293602°W
- State: Maine
- County: Cumberland
- City: Portland

Morrills Corner is a neighborhood and major intersection in Portland, Maine, United States. Centered around the intersection of Forest Avenue (part of U.S. Route 302 and State Route 100), Allen Avenue (SR 100) and Stevens Avenue. It was once home to some of the oldest families in what was the city of Deering, before it was absorbed as a part of the City of Portland.

The Kennebec and Portland Railroad was laid through the neighborhood in 1847. It was abandoned in 1911. The Boston and Maine Railroad also ran through Deering Junction. In 2001, Amtrak began leasing the track for its Downeaster service. From 1914 to 1933, the Portland–Lewiston Interurban entered Portland via the Portland Railroad line from Morrills Corner.

Morrills Corner is named for brother Rufus and Levi Morrill, who lived there in the early 1800s. Lot Myrick Morrill, a governor of Maine, lived at Morrills Corner until he was 23.

== Notable buildings ==
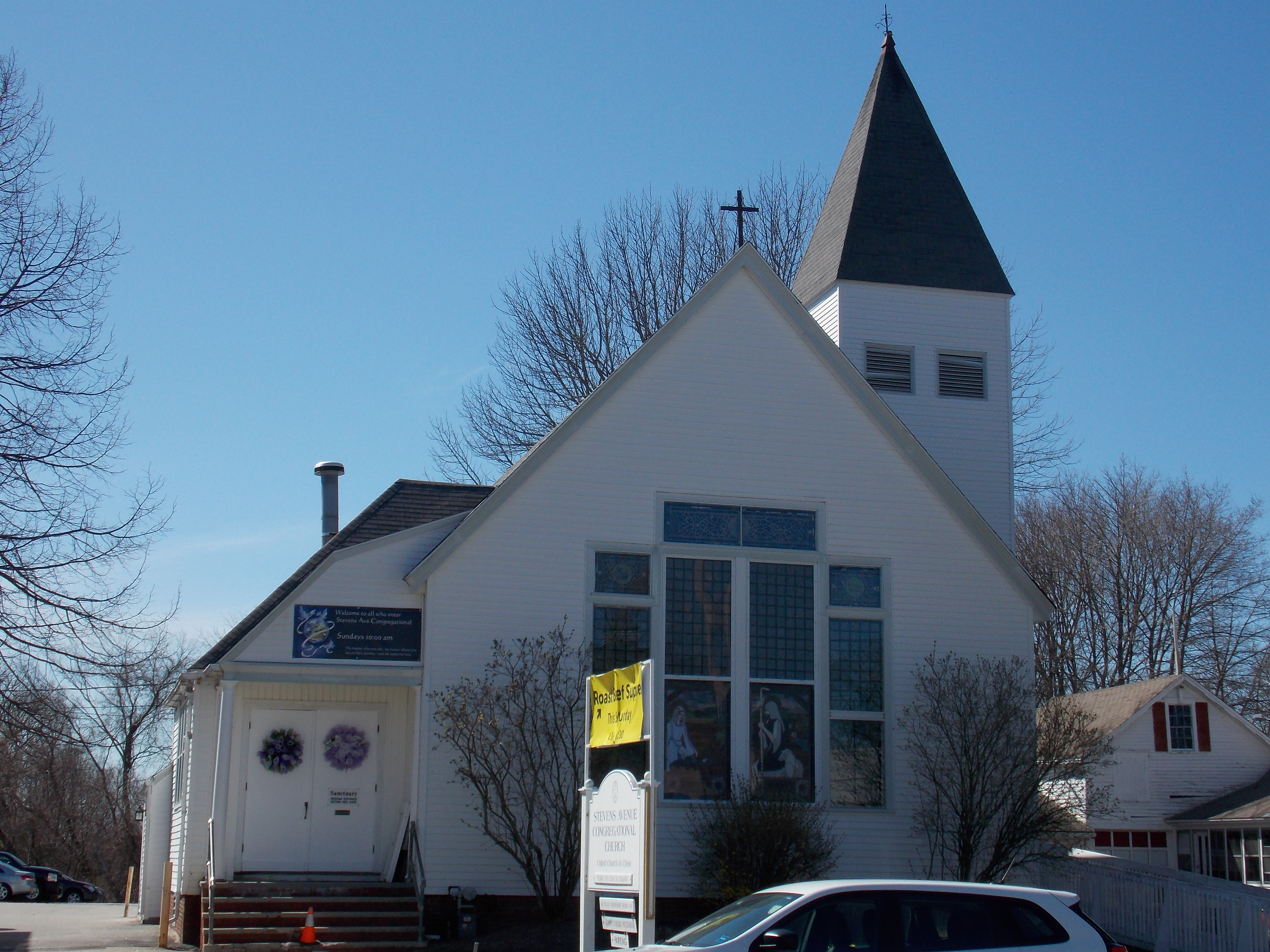
Stevens Avenue Congregational Church (2016)

The below buildings have been noted for their importance by Greater Portland Landmarks.

- 1241 Forest Avenue
- 73–113 Bell Street
- Casco Bottling Company, 80 Bell Street
- Thomas P. Beals Furniture Factory, 58 Morrill Street
- 844 Stevens Avenue (c. 1817), home of George Bishop
- Morrills School, 806–808 Stevens Avenue
- 804 Stevens Avenue (c. 1820), Jesse and Isabel Alden House
- Stevens Avenue Congregational Church, 790 Stevens Avenue (built in 1888)
- Stevens Avenue Armory, 772 Stevens Avenue (built in 1908)

Bogusha's Polish Restaurant and Deli, run by Bogumila Pawlaczyk, has been in business at 825 Stevens Avenue since 1996.

=== Destroyed ===
- Deering Junction Train Station
