= Lincoln Middle School (Portland, Maine) =

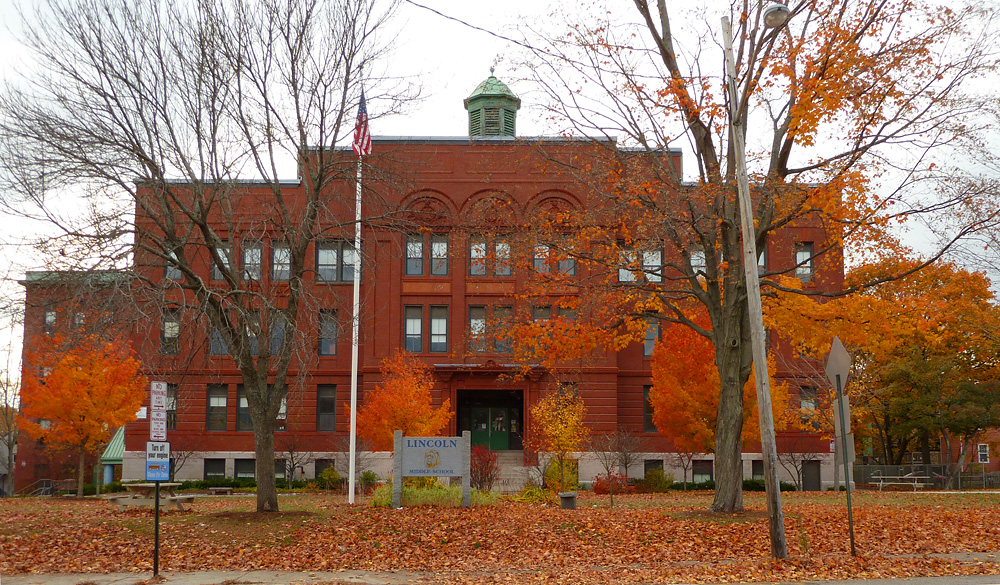

Location
- Portland, Cumberland, Maine 04103; United States
- Coordinates: 43°40′35″N 70°17′44″W

Information
- School type: Government Public
- School district: Portland Public Schools
- Superintendent: Ryan Scallon
- Principal: Aris Ayala
- Grades: 6-8
- Enrollment: 499 (2016-17)
- Colors: Blue and Gold
- Mascot: Lions
- Team name: Lincoln Lions
- Rival: Lyman Moore Falcons

Lincoln Middle School is a middle school in the Deering Center neighborhood of Portland, Maine. The school is located on Stevens Avenue. The principal of the school as of the 2022–2023 school year is Aris Ayala. Lincoln Middle school is divided into houses, two for 7th and 8th grade and three for 6th grade. The students at Lincoln primarily come from three-four of Portland's many elementary schools, Riverton, Rowe, Longfellow, and Ocean Avenue. The mascot of Lincoln Middle School is the Lion.

== History ==
Lincoln Middle School was erected in 1897 and opened in 1899 as Deering High School. In 1913 an annex of 18 classrooms was added to the structure due to the increasing number of students enrolling in Deering High School. On May 21, 1921 a fire broke out in the Library of Deering High School. During the fire, Captain James C. Kent was killed when the roof collapsed upon him. He died later of internal injuries. The school was rebuilt that year. In 1923 the student body overpopulated Deering so a new Deering High School was built further down Stevens Avenue and the current Deering High School became Deering Junior High. In 1925 Deering decided to change its name and rename it in honor of the 16th President, Abraham Lincoln, so Deering Junior High became Lincoln Junior High School.

In 1962 a gymnasium was added to Lincoln in honor of Joseph J. Wagnis, who lost his life while fishing on Sebago Lake. The name of the school was changed to Lincoln Middle School in 1979. In 1994–1995 Lincoln Middle School was renovated and was reopened in 1996. During the two years of the renovation, students attended school at the Stevens Avenue Armory, about a half mile away.

== Geodesic dome ==
In 2007, eighth graders at Lincoln Middle School built a geodesic dome where the modulars had previously been located. This dome was used as a "self-sustaining living classroom", meaning that it provided itself with all of its energy needs. It included solar panels, raised outdoor planting beds and a second floor greenhouse. The dome was taken down in 2025 after being damaged during a storm.

== Demographics ==
As of 2011, Lincoln's racial demographics closely mirrored nearby Deering High School; 65.5 percent white, 16.5 percent black, 13 percent Asian and 5 percent Hispanic students.
