= Sparrow House (Portland, Maine) =

Historic house in Maine, United States

- U.S. National Register of Historic Places
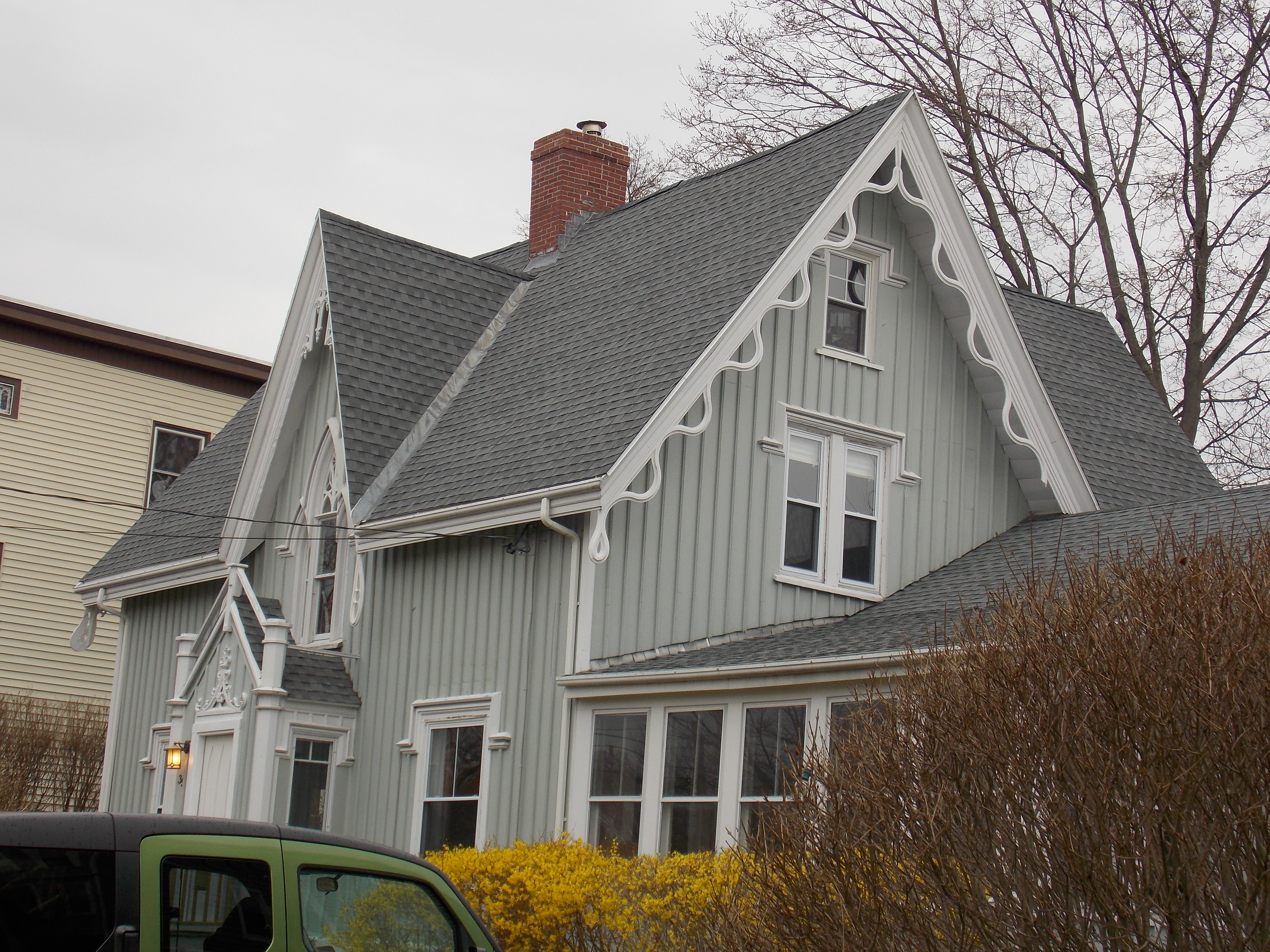
- Pictured in 2016

- Location within Maine Location within the United States
- Location: 35 Arlington Street, Portland, Maine
- Coordinates: 43°40′12″N 70°16′58″W
- Area: 0.3 acres (0.12 ha)
- Built: 1852
- Architectural style: Gothic
- NRHP reference No.: 82000421
- Added to NRHP: October 29, 1982

The Sparrow House is a historic house at 35 Arlington Street in the Woodfords Corner and Back Cove neighborhood of Portland, Maine. Built in 1852, it is a well-preserved example of Gothic Revival architecture. It was listed on the National Register of Historic Places in 1982.

== Description and history ==
The Sparrow House is set on the northwest side of Arlington Street, a residential street between Forest Avenue and Back Cove in Portland's Woodfords Corner neighborhood. It is a 1 1/2-story wood-frame structure, with a steeply pitched gable roof and vertical board siding. The side gables and a front-facing gable above the entrance are decorated with intricate bargeboard. The front gable has a Palladian-style three-part window formed out of narrow lancet-arched windows. A single-story (ell) extends to the right of the main block.

The house was built in 1852, when the area was part of Deering, and was for a number of years the only house in the area. It was built for Warren Sparrow, a Portland businessman who operated a dry goods store and insurance business and was one of the early organizers of Portland's streetcar system. It is along with The Gothic House in Portland's West End, one of the finest examples of Gothic residential architecture in the city. Its architect is unknown.

== See also ==
- National Register of Historic Places listings in Portland, Maine
