= The Great Lost Bear =

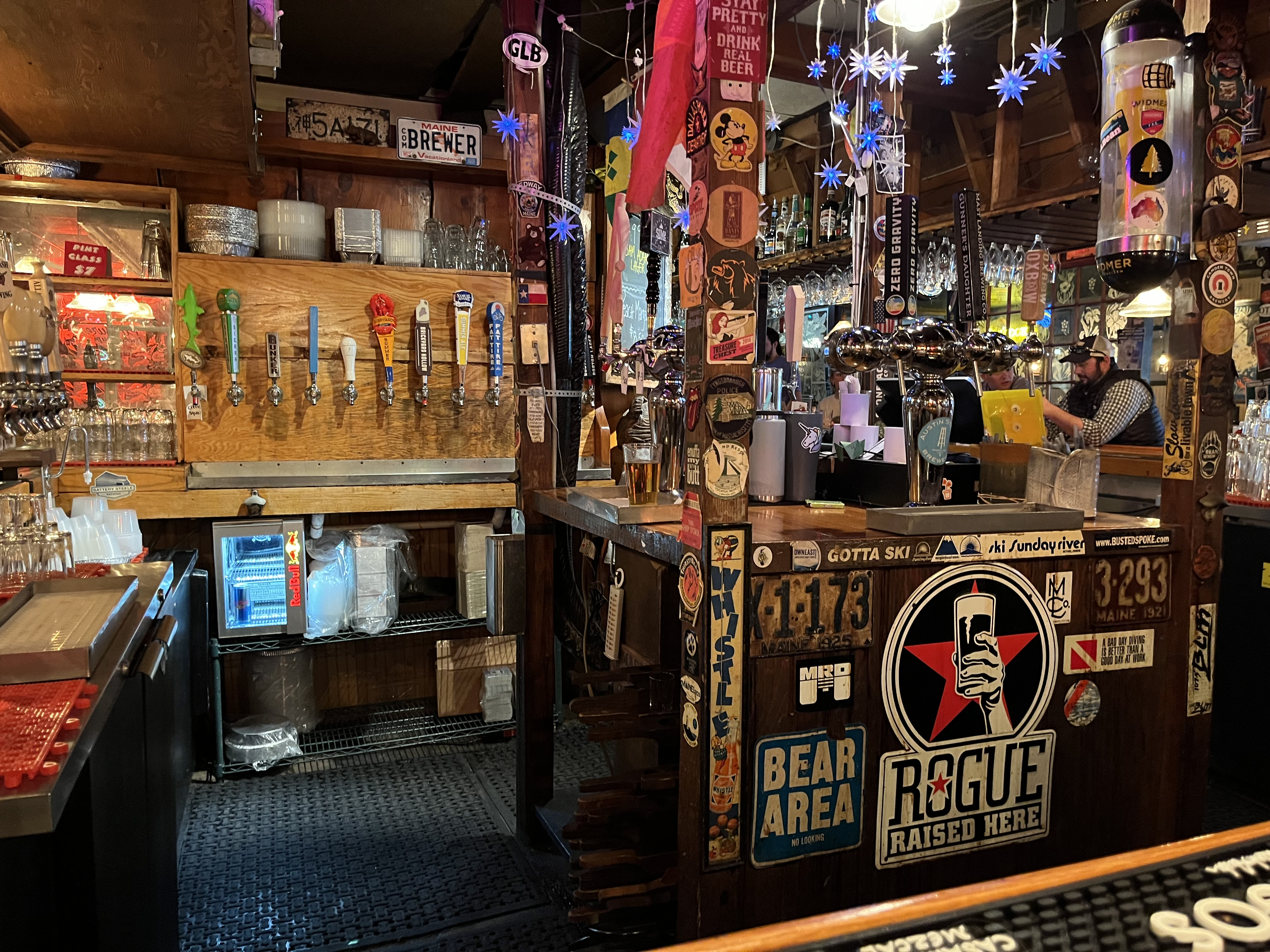
- Bar (2023)
- Interactive map of The Great Lost Bear

Restaurant information
- Established: June 18, 1979 (47 years ago)
- Owners: Mike Dickson (2023–); Mary Dickson (2023–); Andrew Pillsbury (2023–)
- Previous owners: Chip MacConnell (1979–2011); Dave Evans (1979–2023); Weslie Evans (1979–2023)
- Location: 540 Forest Avenue, Portland, Maine, 04101, United States
- Coordinates: 43.6680271°N 70.28024°W
- Website: greatlostbear.com

The Great Lost Bear is a bar and restaurant at 540 Forest Avenue in Portland, Maine, United States. Established in 1979 by Dave and Weslie Evans and Chip MacConnell, it is noted for its selection of draft craft beers.

== History ==
The bar's location was formerly occupied by a rock club named Bottoms Up and, in the rear of the buildings, Nappi's Bakery. The new venture, originally named The Grizzly Bear, opened on June 18, 1979, and it received no customers that day.

In 1981, the name of the business was changed to The Great Lost Bear after a cease-and-desist letter was received from Grizzly Bear Pizza in Oregon. The "Grizzly" sign now hangs in the restaurant's dining room.

The Evanses purchased MacConnell's share of the business in 2011, becoming sole owners. The same year, the bar appeared in an episode of Drinking Made Easy.

Notable past patrons include Jerry Seinfeld. Mystery novelist John Connolly wrote a series of novels about detective Charlie Parker and starting with the 2009 novel titled The Lovers, the character Parker takes a job as a bartender at The Great Lost Bear.

In May 2023, Mike and Mary Dickson, along with Andrew Pillsbury, purchased the business from the Evans family. Each of the trio had worked at the establishment for over thirty years at that point.

In September 2023, a celebration of life of D.L. Geary Brewing Company's founder David L. Geary took place during happy hour at the bar.

== Menu ==
Today, the bar has around seventy beer taps. In 2018 it was voted Best Beer Bar in Maine by CraftBeer.com.

The food menu has burgers, wings, nachos and a vegetarian section called Carnivores Beware. It participated in Maine Restaurant Week in 2010 and offered a vegetarian meal of spanakopita.

A menu from The Great Lost Bear in 1982 is included in a collection of menus held at the Portland Public Library. In that year, according to this menu, a hamburger cost $3.65 and a vegetarian Reuben sandwich cost $3.35.

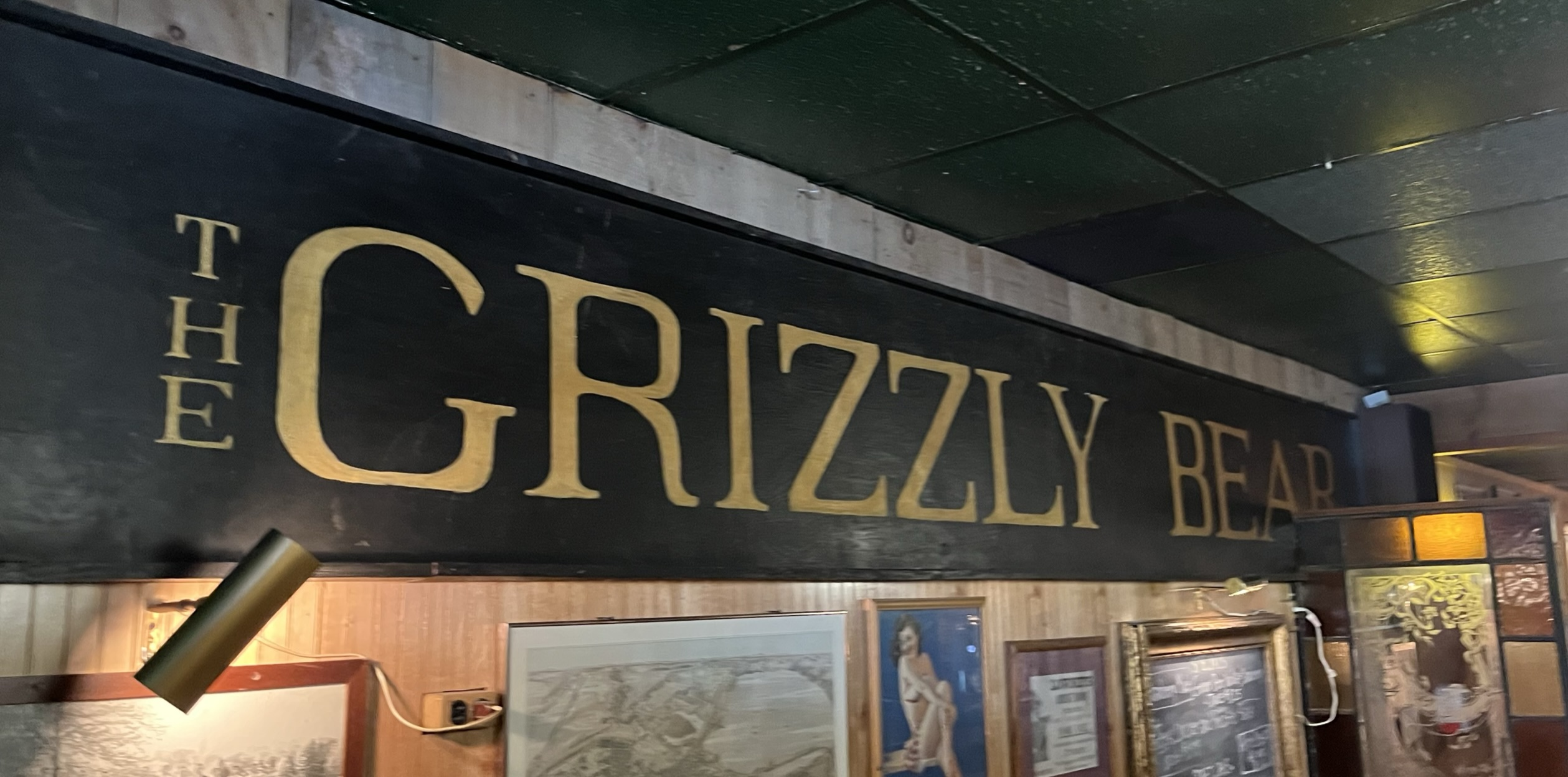
The sign of the business under its original name (2022)
