= Woodfords Congregational Church =

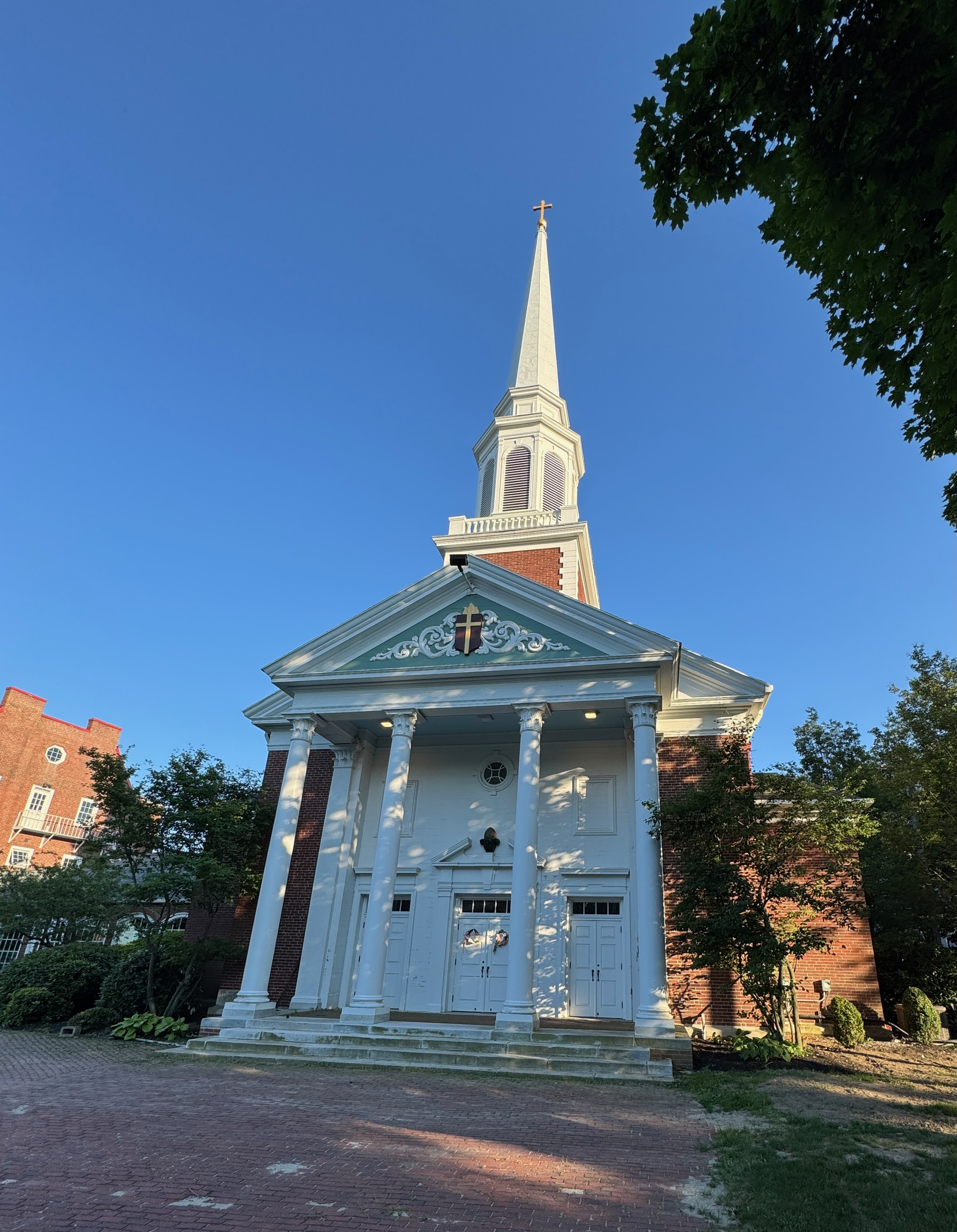
- The church in 2024
- Woodfords Congregational Church
- 43.670687°N 70.287655°W
- Location: 202 Woodford Street; Portland, Maine, U.S.
- Country: United States
- Website: www.woodfordschurch.org

Architecture
- Functional status: In use
- Architectural type: Colonial Revival
- Completed: 1956 (70 years ago)

Woodfords Congregational Church is a church on Woodford Street in Portland, Maine, United States. Located a few yards west of Woodfords Corner, the church was built in 1959, replacing one which was designed by architects Francis H. Fassett and E. F. Fassett and which stood, on the opposite side of what was then called Spring Street, between 1872 and 1956. The original church bell was moved to the new construction. The Parish House was built in 1926.

In 2021, discussions began regarding the sale of one of the church buildings to Community Housing of Maine, to be used for senior housing.

== Congregation ==
A congregational society was established in 1867 by local residents, some of whom were members of the Fourth Parish Church at the old Bradley Meeting House on Capisic Street.
