= Woodfords Corner =

Road intersection in Portland, Maine, U.S.

- Neighborhood in Portland, Maine
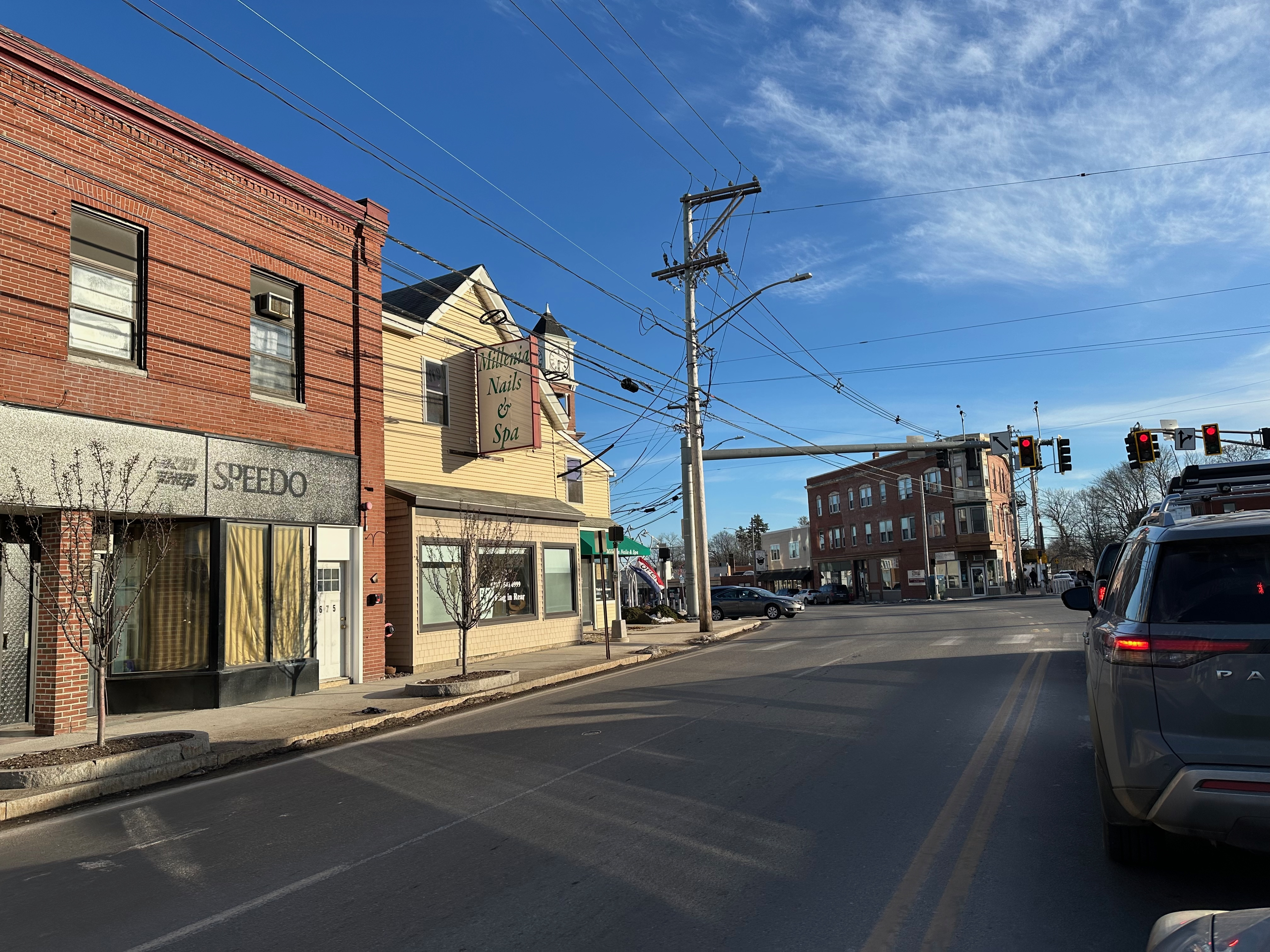
- Looking south along Forest Avenue in 2024
- Location in Portland, Maine
- Coordinates: 43.67087°N 70.28442°W
- State: Maine
- County: Cumberland
- City: Portland

Woodfords Corner is a neighborhood and major intersection in Portland, Maine, United States. Centered around the intersections of Forest Avenue (part of U.S. Route 302) and Woodford Street, it is named for brothers Chauncey, Ebenezer and Isaiah Woodford, merchants from Connecticut who settled in the area.

The corner developed in the 18th century as part of a major route from the Portland peninsula inland to the northwest. It is at the convergence of four neighborhoods: Back Cove, Oakdale, Deering Center and Rosemont.

The Kennebec and Portland Railroad was laid through the neighborhood in 1847. It was abandoned in 1911.

One of the most prominent buildings in Woodfords Corner is the Independent Order of Odd Fellows Block (IOOF). Located on the eastern side of the intersection, the building's clock tower was restored in 2017 at a cost of $60,000.

The nearby Woodfords Congregational Church was dedicated in 1872. The original church was demolished in 1956, and was rebuilt three years later on the opposite side of the street.

Woodfords Club is a social club and event space for area elites founded in 1913.

Donald Valle opened a beer parlor in Woodfords Corner in the early 1930s, the start of his Valle's Steak House empire.

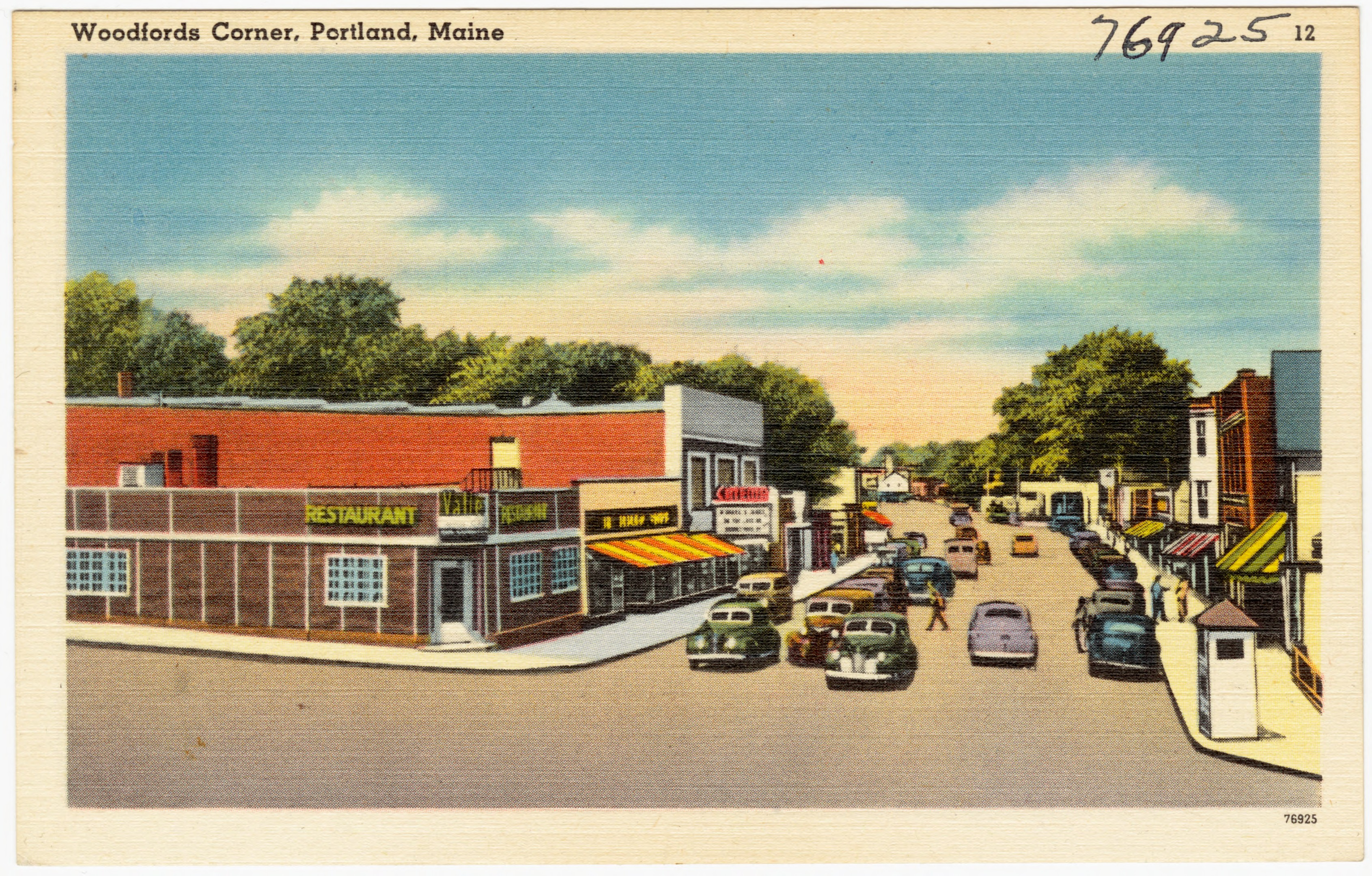
A postcard, dated between 1930 and 1945, showing a northwestern view of Woodfords Corner, with Forest Avenue being crossed by Woodford Avenue.

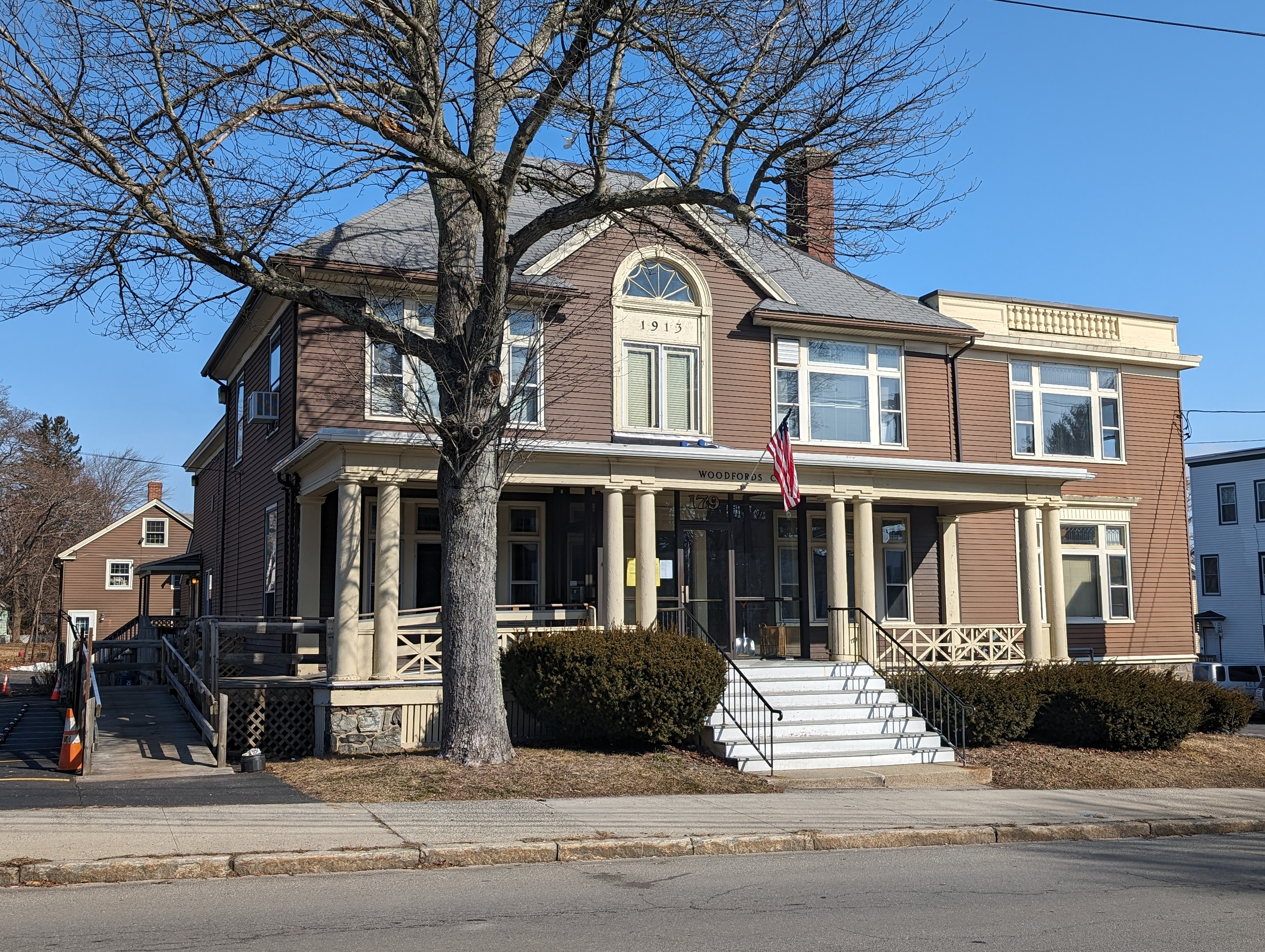
The Woodfords Club circa 2024.

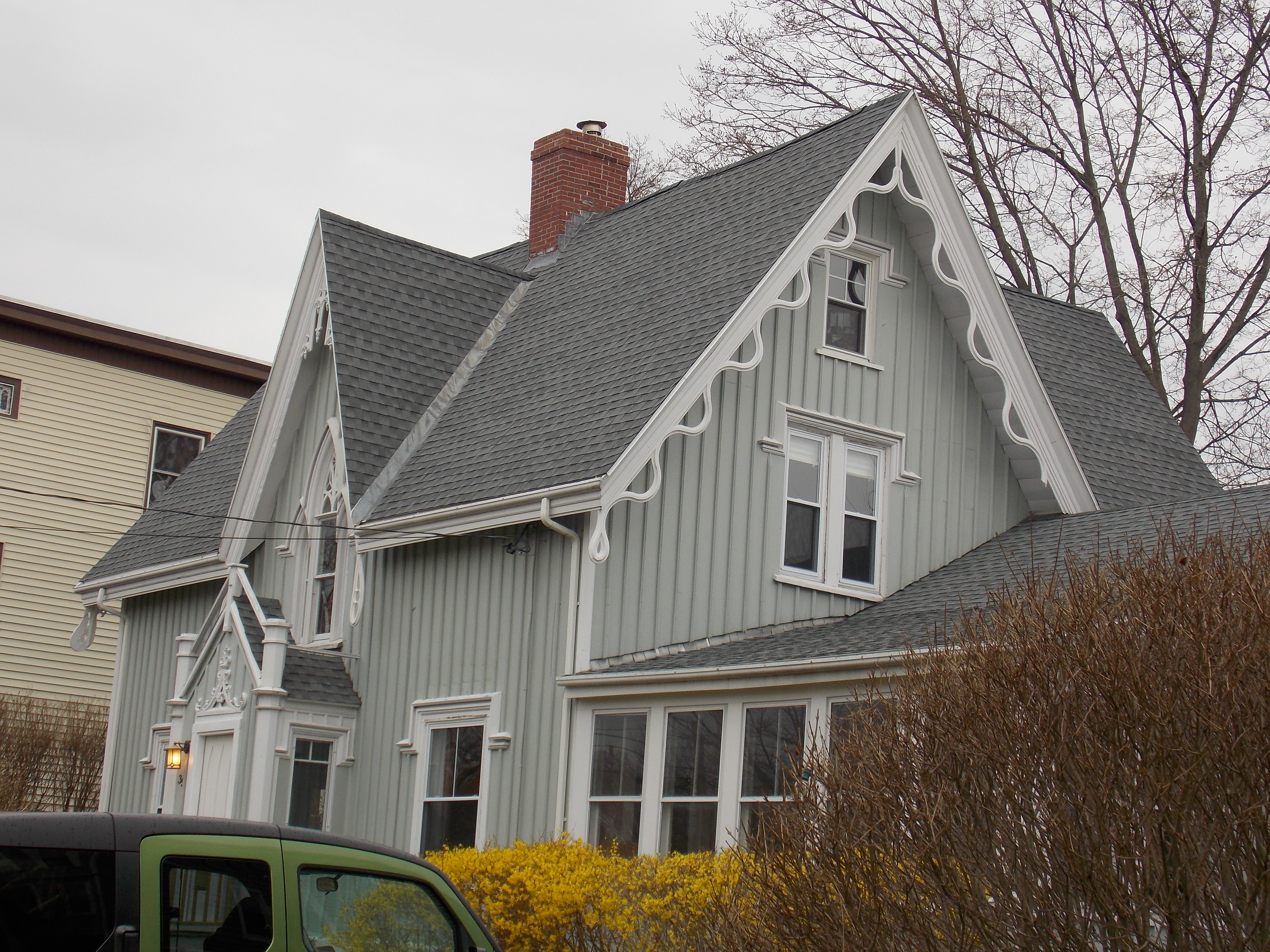
The historic Sparrow House.

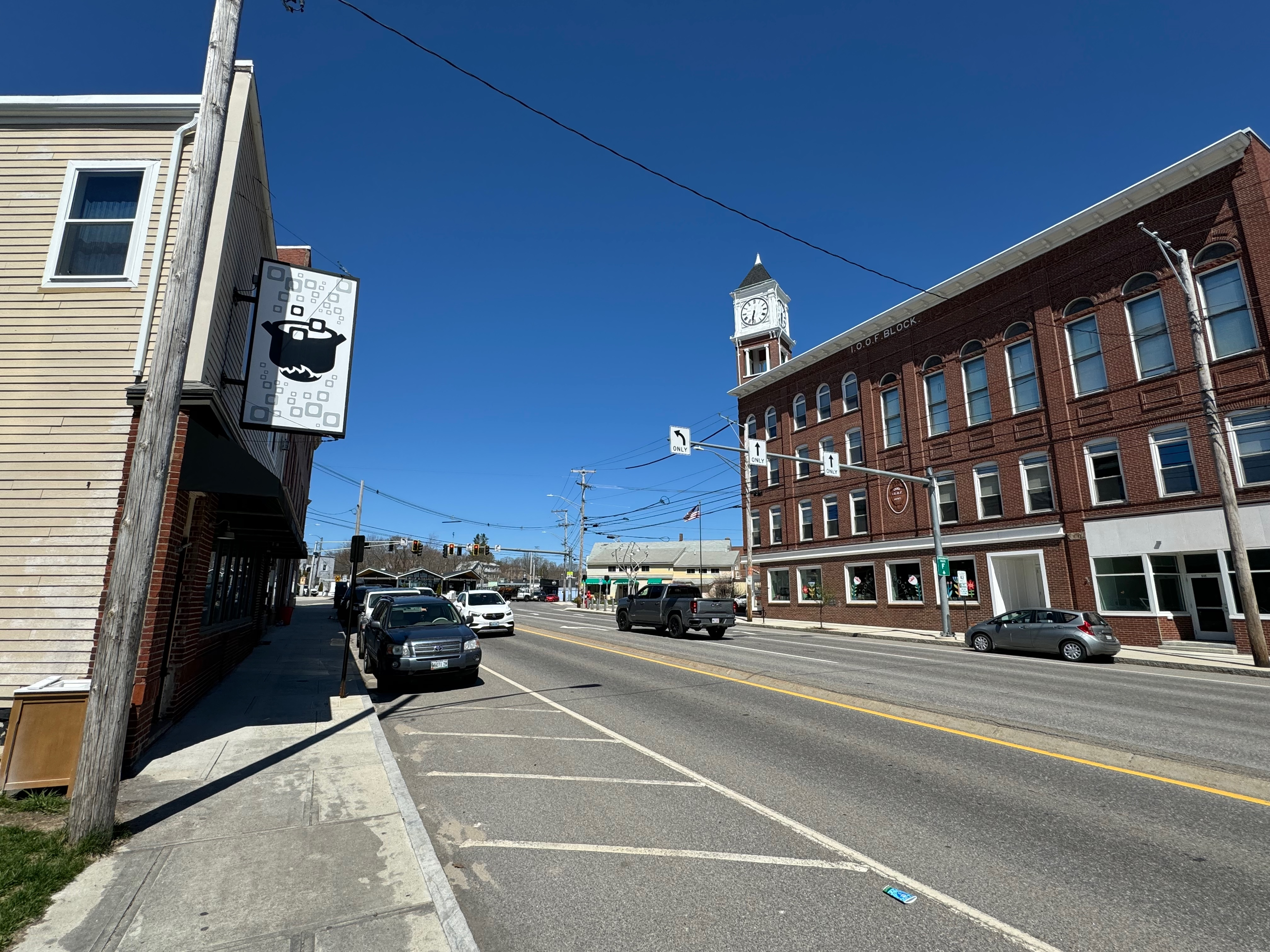
The Independent Order of Odd Fellows Block, looking northwest along Forest Avenue toward Woodfords Corner

== See also ==
- Portland Railroad Company
