= Deering Center, Maine =

Neighborhood in Portland, Maine, United States

Coordinates: 43°40′29″N 70°17′49″W

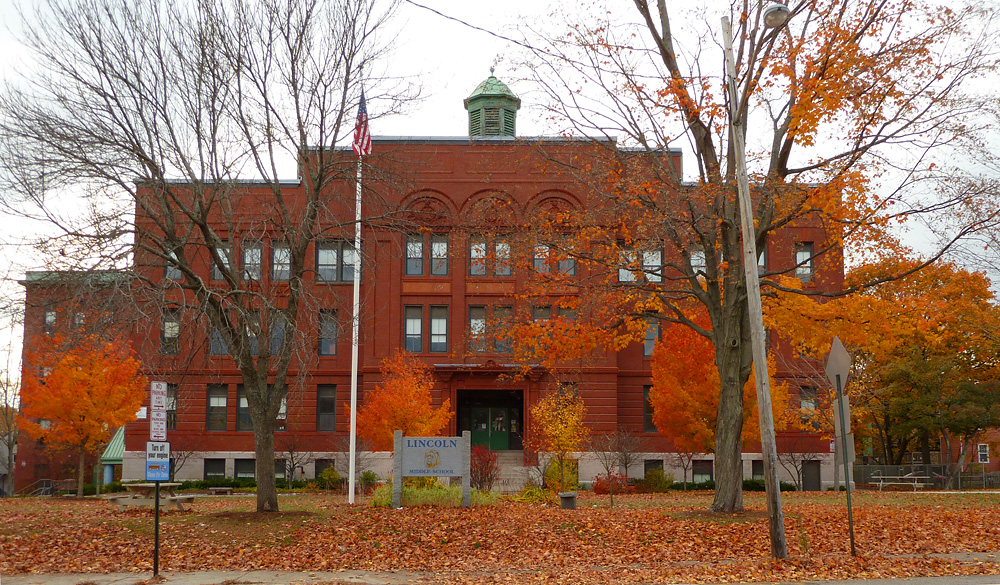
Lincoln Middle School on Stevens Avenue

Deering Center is a neighborhood in the residential area of Portland, Maine, United States. It runs from Brighton Avenue to Forest Avenue to Walton Street, then past Evergreen Cemetery, near Wayside Street on Ludlow Street.

== History ==
Formerly known as the town of Deering, Maine, which separated from Westbrook in 1871. It was incorporated into Portland as Deering Center on March 9, 1899.

== Etymology ==
Deering Center is named for Captain James Deering, horse farmer and early resident of the neighborhood.

== Education ==
Several schools are located in Deering Center:

- Deering High School
- Lincoln Middle School
- Henry Wadsworth Longfellow Elementary School

== Notable people ==
- Francis Ormand Jonathan Smith, U.S. Congressman
- Scott Wilson, served on United States Court of Appeals for the First Circuit
