= Cumberland Avenue =

Street in Portland, Maine, United States

Coordinates: 43.65966°N 70.25861°W

- Cumberland Street (formerly)
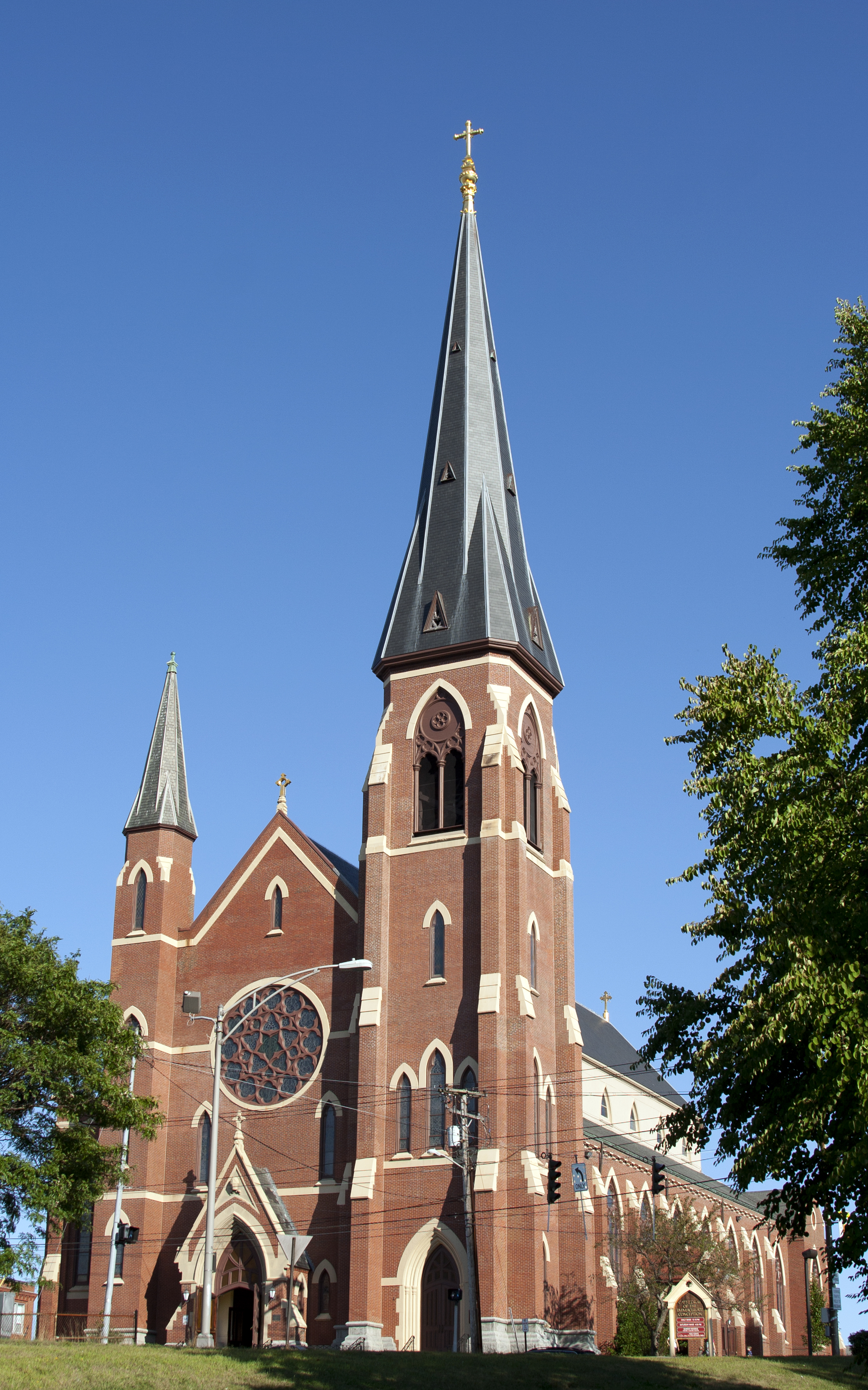
- The Cathedral of the Immaculate Conception, a prominent part of the Portland skyline, stands on Cumberland Avenue at its intersection with Franklin Street
- Interactive map of Cumberland Avenue
- Part of: SR 100
- Length: 2.57 mi (4.14 km)
- Location: Portland, Maine, U.S.
- Northeast end: Merrill Street
- Southwest end: Deering Avenue

Cumberland Avenue (formerly Cumberland Street; colloquially known as Cumberland Ave) is a downtown street in Portland, Maine, United States. Part of Maine State Route 100, it runs for around 1.57 miles (2.53 km) from Merrill Street, on Munjoy Hill, in the northeast, to Deering Avenue in the southwest.

Portland High School is located on Cumberland Avenue between Chestnut Street and Elm Street, while the Cathedral of the Immaculate Conception stands between Franklin Street (U.S. Route 1A) and Locust Street. Franklin Towers, formerly the tallest residential building in Maine, is located on the western side of the intersection.

Peppermint Park, a children's playground, occupies the block between Smith Street and Montgomery Street.

== Major intersections ==
Cumberland Avenue crosses the following major intersections (from northeast to southwest):

- Washington Avenue (Maine State Route 26)
- Franklin Street (U.S. Route 1A)
- Forest Avenue (at the southern terminus of State Route 100)
- High Street
- State Street (State Route 77)

== Notable businesses ==
415 Cumberland Avenue once served as one of the city's two post offices.

Portland Public Market, in West Bayside, formerly occupied the building at the northeastern corner of Cumberland Avenue and Preble Street.

Maria's Ristorante was in business at 337 Cumberland Avenue between 1960 and 2019, when it moved to Outer Congress Street. DiPietro's Italian Sandwiches operated between 1944 and 2013 at 171 Cumberland Avenue.

The former Preble Chapel, at 331 Cumberland Avenue (the intersection with Preble Avenue), was built in 1851. It was designed by John Kirby.

Cumberland Avenue Garage, at 122 Cumberland Avenue, near its intersection with Washington Avenue, was established in 1983.

== Public transportation ==
Greater Portland Metro's route 8 (Peninsula Loop) serves Cumberland Avenue.
