= U.S. Post Office-Portland Maine =

- U.S. National Register of Historic Places
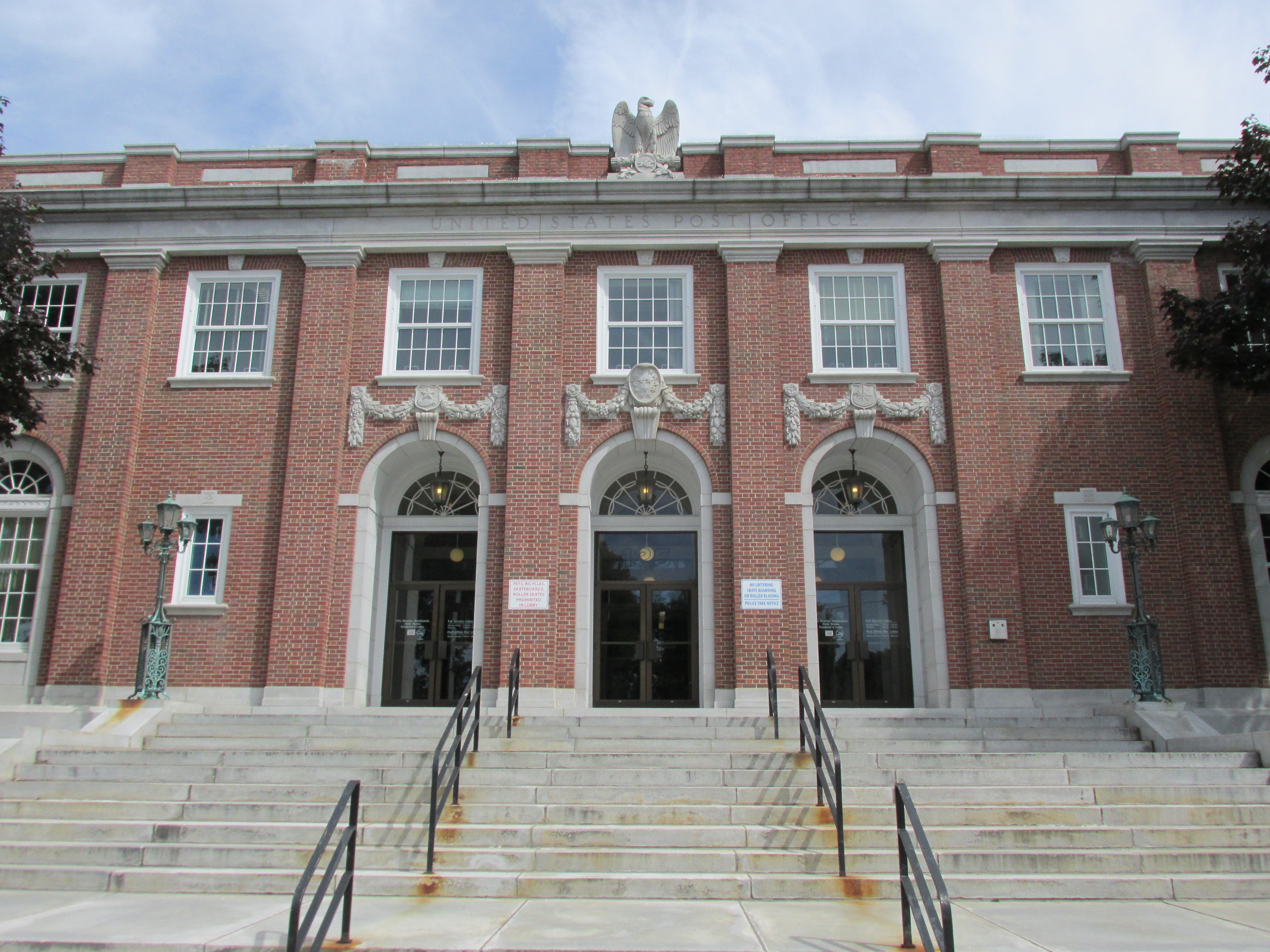

- Location within Maine Location within the United States
- Location: 125 Forest Avenue, Portland, Maine
- Coordinates: 43°39′30″N 70°16′0″W
- Area: 4 acres (1.6 ha)
- Built: 1932
- Architect: John Calvin Stevens; John Howard Stevens
- Architectural style: Colonial Revival, New England Colonial
- NRHP reference No.: 86001011
- Added to NRHP: May 9, 1986

The Portland Main Post Office is located at 125 Forest Avenue in the Parkside neighborhood of Portland, Maine. The building in which it is located, now shared with other businesses, was built in 1932 to a design by noted Maine architects John Calvin Stevens and John Howard Stevens and enlarged in 1967. It was listed on the National Register of Historic Places in 1986 for its Colonial Revival architecture.

== Description and history ==
The Portland Main Post Office is located on the east side of Forest Avenue, across the street from Deering Oaks park. The building and its associated parking areas occupy the entire block bounded on the north by Kennebec Street and on the south by Portland Street. The southern part of the building is its older portion; it is a steel-framed structure finished in brick and stone, two stories in height. Its front is divided into thirteen bays, articulated by brick pilasters, with most of the ground-floor bays filled with windows set in round-arch openings. The center three bays house the original main entrance, and the outer three bays on each side are in projecting wings with gabled fronts. The addition to the north is of roughly equal size to the original, but has much simpler styling.

The post office was built in 1932, at an appropriated cost of $850,000. When built, it was the second largest post office in New England, second in size to that in Boston, Massachusetts. It was designed by the father-and-son team of John Calvin Stevens and John Howard Stevens in the "New England Colonial" style, a blend of Colonial and Classical Revival styles. The addition, built in 1967 to house other federal offices, was designed by Richard Wright of Lewiston. The post office is now located in the addition; the original building now houses a variety of commercial, professional, and government offices.

== See also ==
- National Register of Historic Places listings in Portland, Maine
- List of United States post offices
