= Stevens Avenue Armory =

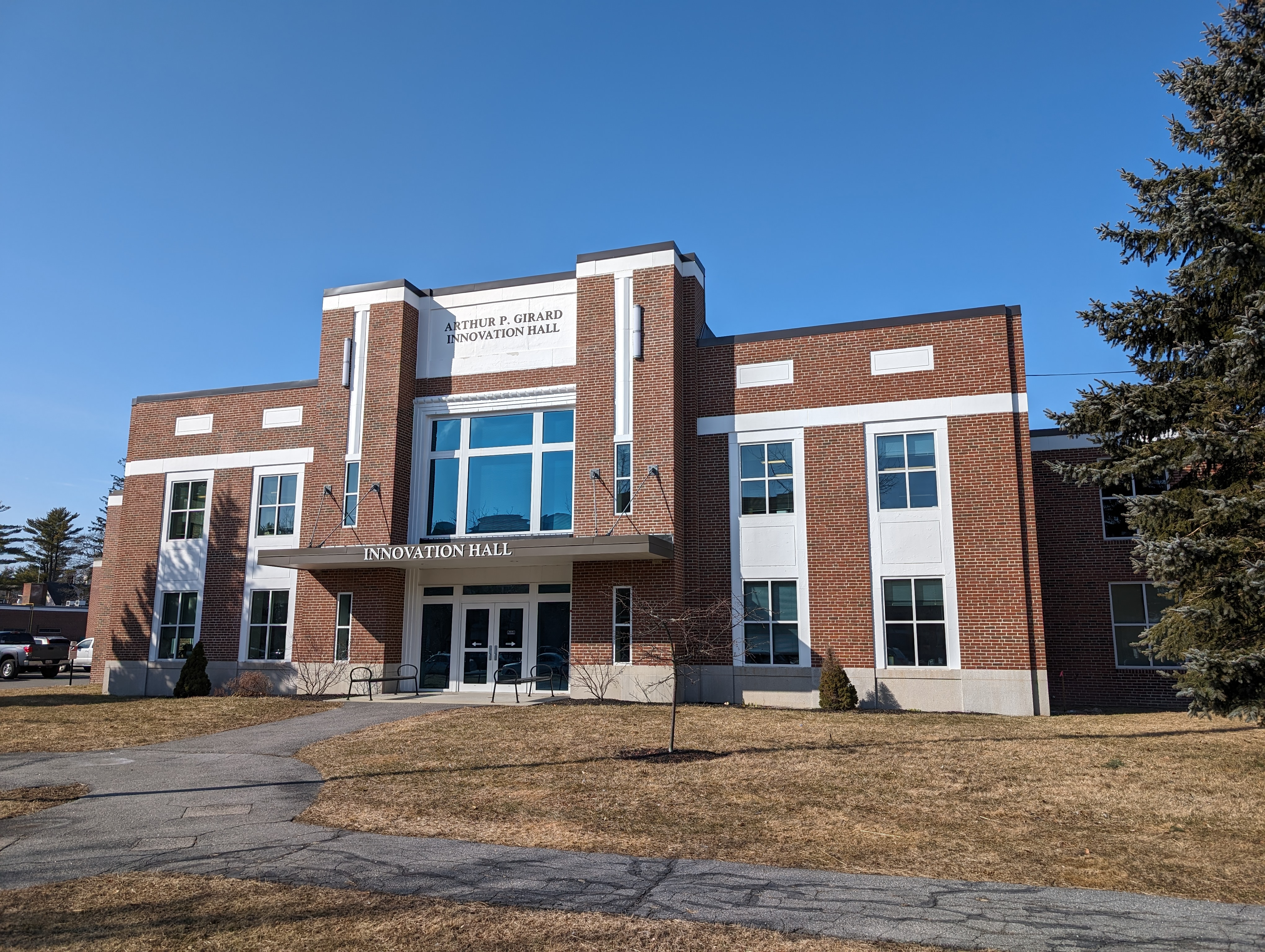
- Interactive map of the Stevens Avenue Armory area

General information
- Location: 772 Stevens Avenue, Portland, Maine, United States
- Coordinates: 43.6850°N 70.2943°W
- Completed: 1908 (118 years ago)

The Stevens Avenue Armory (now known as Arthur P. Girard Innovation Hall) is a historic former armory building on Stevens Avenue in Portland, Maine, United States. Built in 1908 as a utilitarian two-story brick barn for the Portland Railroad Company's electric trolleys, it was converted into its current Art Deco style in 1940 by local architect and World War I veteran John P. Thomas. Thomas also designed other nearby buildings, including Deering High School. The armory was used by the Maine National Guard for training and recruitment purposes until 2015, when it was swapped for 29 acres of land along Route 1 in Saco that was owned by the University of New England (UNE). The building was valued at $3.1 million at the time of the swap.

In 2022, UNE finished renovating and expanding the building and renamed it the Arthur P. Girard Innovation Hall.
