= Forest Avenue =

Street in Portland, Maine

Coordinates: 43.68091°N 70.28955°W

- Green Street (formerly)
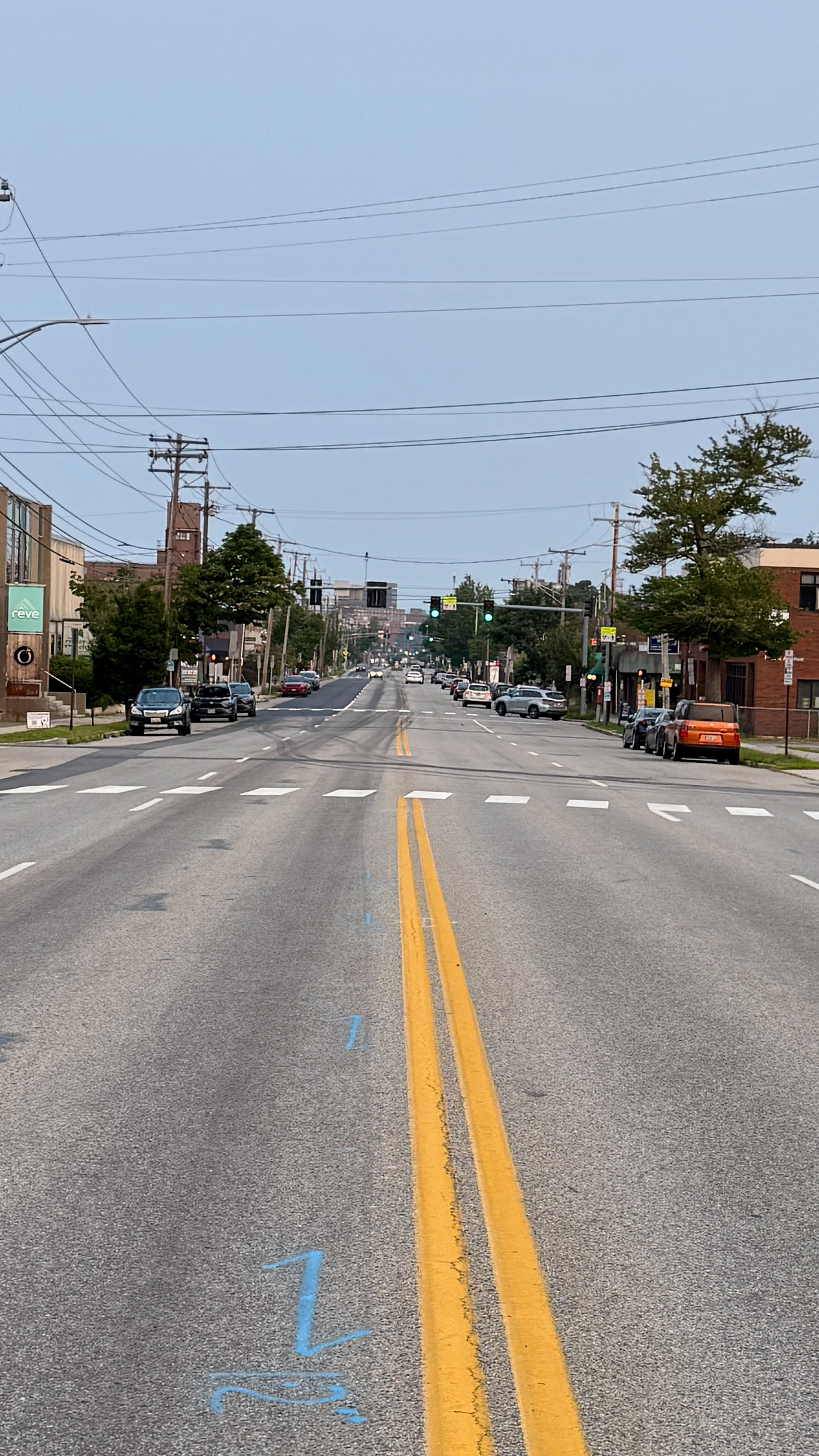
- A stretch of Forest Avenue approaching downtown Portland, Maine, looking southeast
- Interactive map of Forest Avenue
- Part of: US 302
- Length: 4.81 mi (7.74 km)
- Location: Portland, Maine, U.S.
- Northwest end: US 302 (Bridgton Road) & East Bridge Street
- Southeast end: Congress Street

Forest Avenue (formerly known as Green Street; colloquially known as Forest Ave) is a major street in Portland, Maine, United States. It runs for around 4.81 miles (7.74 km), from Bridgton Road in the northwest to Congress Street, in downtown Portland, in the southeast. It is the main artery for traffic entering and leaving Portland to and from the west via city streets. Forest Avenue passes to the south of Back Cove, while Washington Avenue passes to its north. The street ends in Portland's Arts District.

Forest Avenue is part of U.S. Route 302 (US 302) for almost its entire course. US 302 reaches its eastern terminus at Forest Avenue's interchange with Interstate 295 (I-295) and U.S. Route 1 (US 1) at the southern end of the Back Cove neighborhood.

== Route ==
Forest Avenue picks up the U.S. Route 302 designation from Bridgton Road at its crossing of the Presumpscot River on the border between Westbrook and the Riverton area of Portland. It continues southeast, crossing Riverside Street and passing beneath Interstate 95. At Allen Avenue in Morrills Corner, Forest Avenue picks up the Maine State Route 100 (SR 100) designation, continuing southward toward the historic Woodfords Corner neighborhood. There, at its intersection with Ocean Avenue, Forest Avenue crosses the former Maine Central Railroad, used today by Amtrak's Downeaster service. At Woodford Street, Forest Avenue turns southeast as it begins its final approach into downtown Portland. In the Oakdale neighborhood, Forest Avenue develops central turning lanes between the Preble Street and Baxter Boulevard intersections. Near University of Southern Maine's Glickman Library, Forest Avenue passes through the cloverleaf intersection formed by I-295's exits 6A and 6B. It is at this point that Forest Avenue drops its US 302 designation, but continues as SR 100.

After emerging from the cloverleaf, Forest Avenue crosses an intersection with Marginal Way to the east and State Street (State Route 77) at the eastern edge of Deering Oaks Park. It begins running parallel to High Street at this point. After passing the historic United States Post Office at the corner of Portland Street, in the Parkside neighborhood, Forest Avenue begins climbing the prominent hill of the central part of the Portland peninsula. In its final stretch, Forest Avenue crosses Cumberland Avenue before terminating at Congress Street in Congress Square.

=== Forest Avenue study ===
In 2012, the City of Portland completed a five-year Transforming Forest Avenue study, which envisioned a move away from the strip-mall design evident in the one-mile stretch between I-295 and Woodfords Corner, instead favoring a pedestrian-friendly layout.

== Notable addresses ==
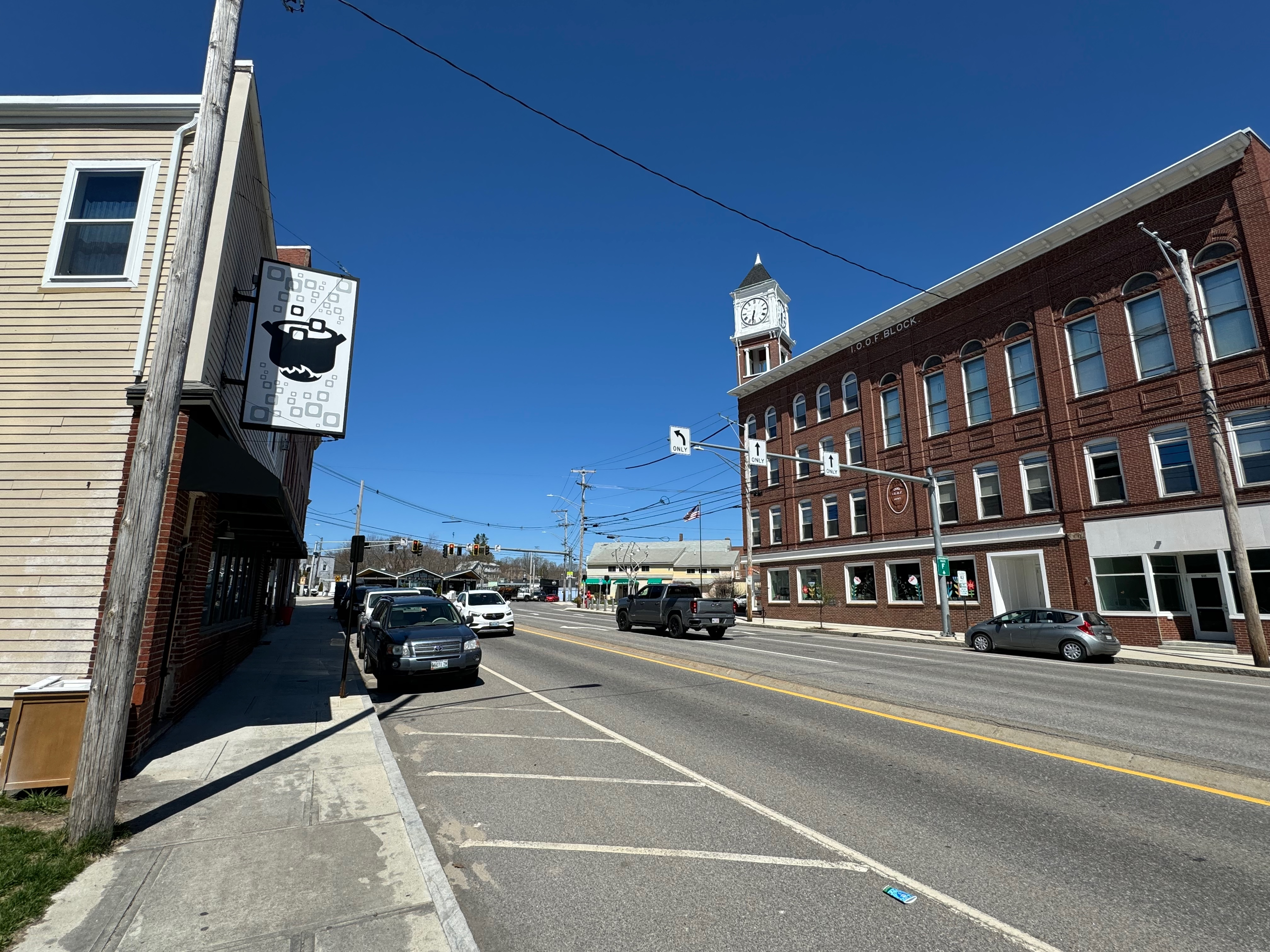
Independent Order of Odd Fellows Block, Woodfords Corner, 643–651 Forest Avenue

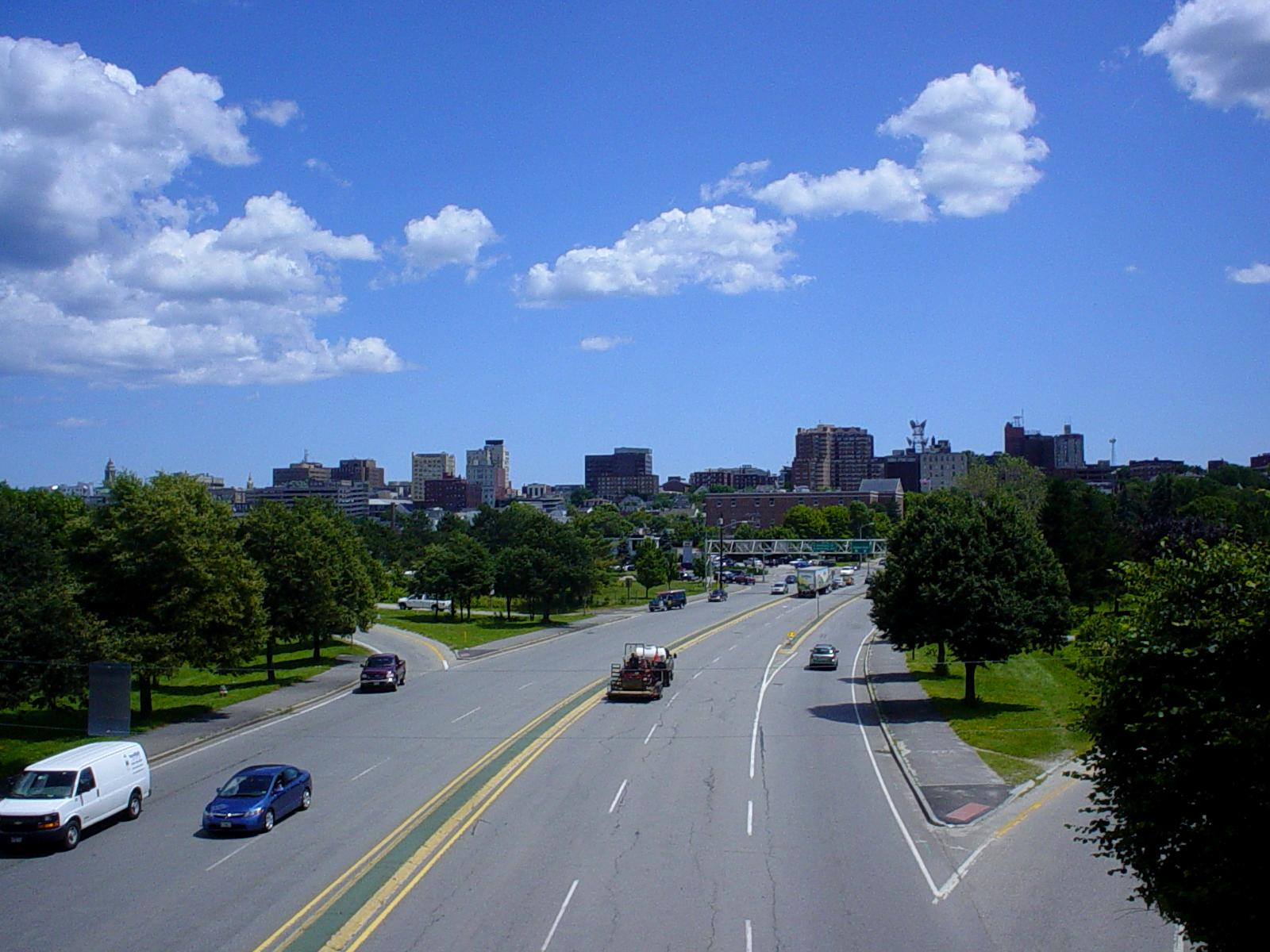
Forest Avenue and the skyline of downtown Portland, Maine, looking southeast

The City of Portland has designated as Individual City Landmarks five of seventeen historic buildings on Forest Avenue:

- 660 Forest Avenue (Woodford Food & Beverage as of 2024)
- 648 Forest Avenue
- Independent Order of Odd Fellows Block, 643–651 Forest Avenue
- 630 Forest Avenue
- Great Atlantic and Pacific Tea Company Store (1915), 617–619 Forest Avenue

Other notable addresses (from northwest to southeast:)

- Baxter Woods, a nature preserve and municipal forest
- The Great Lost Bear, 540 Forest Avenue
- 517–533 Forest Avenue
- Forest Gardens/David Munster Building, 371–373 Forest Avenue
- Creative Trails Building, 369 Forest Avenue
- Oakhurst Dairy, 364 Forest Avenue
- Palmer Spring, 351–355 Forest Avenue, a successor to L. C. Glidden Auto Company, which began making springs for horse-drawn carriages in 1849
- 331–337 Forest Avenue (1920)
- Portland Main Post Office (1932), listed on the National Register of Historic Places
- Portland Stage Company, 25A Forest Avenue

In 2016, the City of Portland's plans to demolish five Forest Avenue buildings, to be replaced by a CVS store, was met with public outcry.

=== Destroyed buildings ===
The City Hotel formerly stood at the southern corner of today's Forest Avenue and Congress Street. It was demolished in 1894 and replaced two years later by the Congress Square Hotel.

== Public transportation ==
Greater Portland Metro's routes 2 (Forest Avenue), 3 (Westbrook Crosstown) and 4 (Westbrook), and Biddeford Saco Old Orchard Beach Transit's route 70, serve Forest Avenue.

== See also ==
- Portland Railroad Company
