= Bramhall (disambiguation) =

Bramhall is a suburb of the Metropolitan Borough of Stockport.

== People ==
- Andrea Bramhall (born 1979), British writer
- Art Bramhall (1909–1985), American baseball player
- Doyle Bramhall (1949–2011), American singer-songwriter and drummer
- Doyle Bramhall II (born 1968), guitarist and vocalist in his band Smokestack and was also the second guitarist in Eric Clapton's band from 2004 to 2009
- George Bramhall (1637–1689), an early settler of Portland, Maine, United States
- John Bramhall (1594–1633), Anglican bishop and philosopher; Archbishop of Armagh
- John Bramhall (born 1956), English former professional footballer
- Mae Bramhall (c. 1861–1897), American actress and writer

== Places ==
- Bramhall (mansion), a building which formerly stood in Portland, Maine

== See also ==
- Bramhall Hill in Portland, Maine
- Bramhall railway station
