= Michael Sylvester =

Michael Sylvester may refer to:

- Mike Sylvester (born 1951), American basketball player
- Michael Sylvester (politician), American politician and labor organizer
- Michael Sylvester (tenor), American operatic lyric-spinto tenor
