= Deering Oaks Park =

Coordinates: 43°39′32″N 70°16′15″W

- U.S. National Register of Historic Places
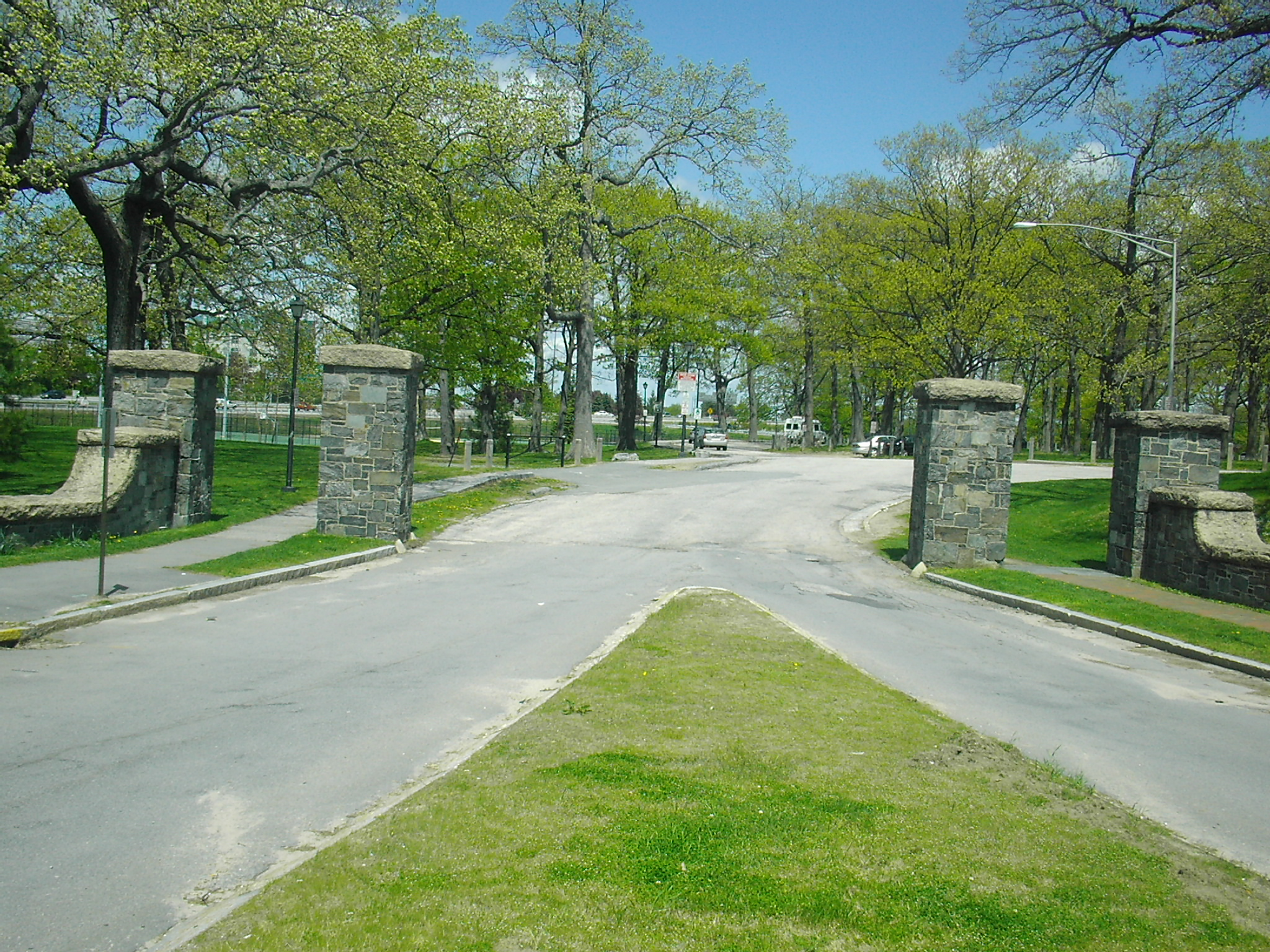
- Entrance to Deering Oaks Park from Deering Avenue
- Location: Portland, Maine
- Area: 55 acres (22 ha)
- Built: 1879
- Architect: William A. Goodwin; Olmsted Brothers
- NRHP reference No.: 89001708
- Added to NRHP: October 16, 1989

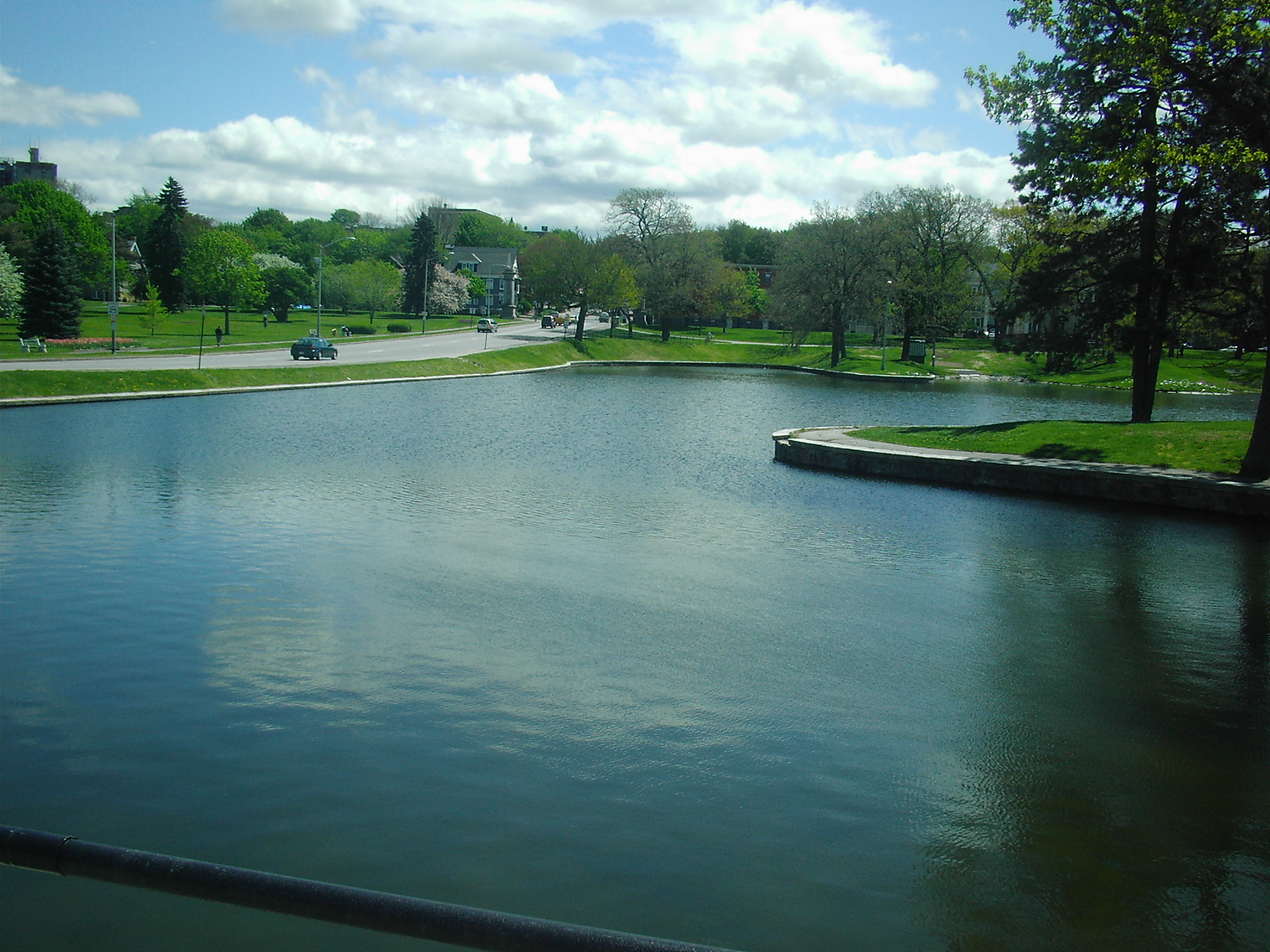
Deering Oaks Pond with State Street visible on the left

Deering Oaks Park is a 55-acre (22 ha) public park in Portland, Maine, listed on the National Register of Historic Places. Established in 1879 as part of Frederick Law Olmsted's master plan for Portland's park system, the park represents a significant example of 19th-century landscape architecture and urban planning. The park features recreational facilities including baseball diamonds, tennis courts, a playground, and a central pond, and serves as home to the Portland Farmers' Market.

Located west of downtown Portland, the park is bordered by Deering Avenue to the west, Forest Avenue to the east, Park Avenue to the south, and Interstate 295 to the north. State Street and High Street traverse the park, with primary access points from State Street, Deering Avenue, and Park Avenue.

== History ==
=== Early history ===
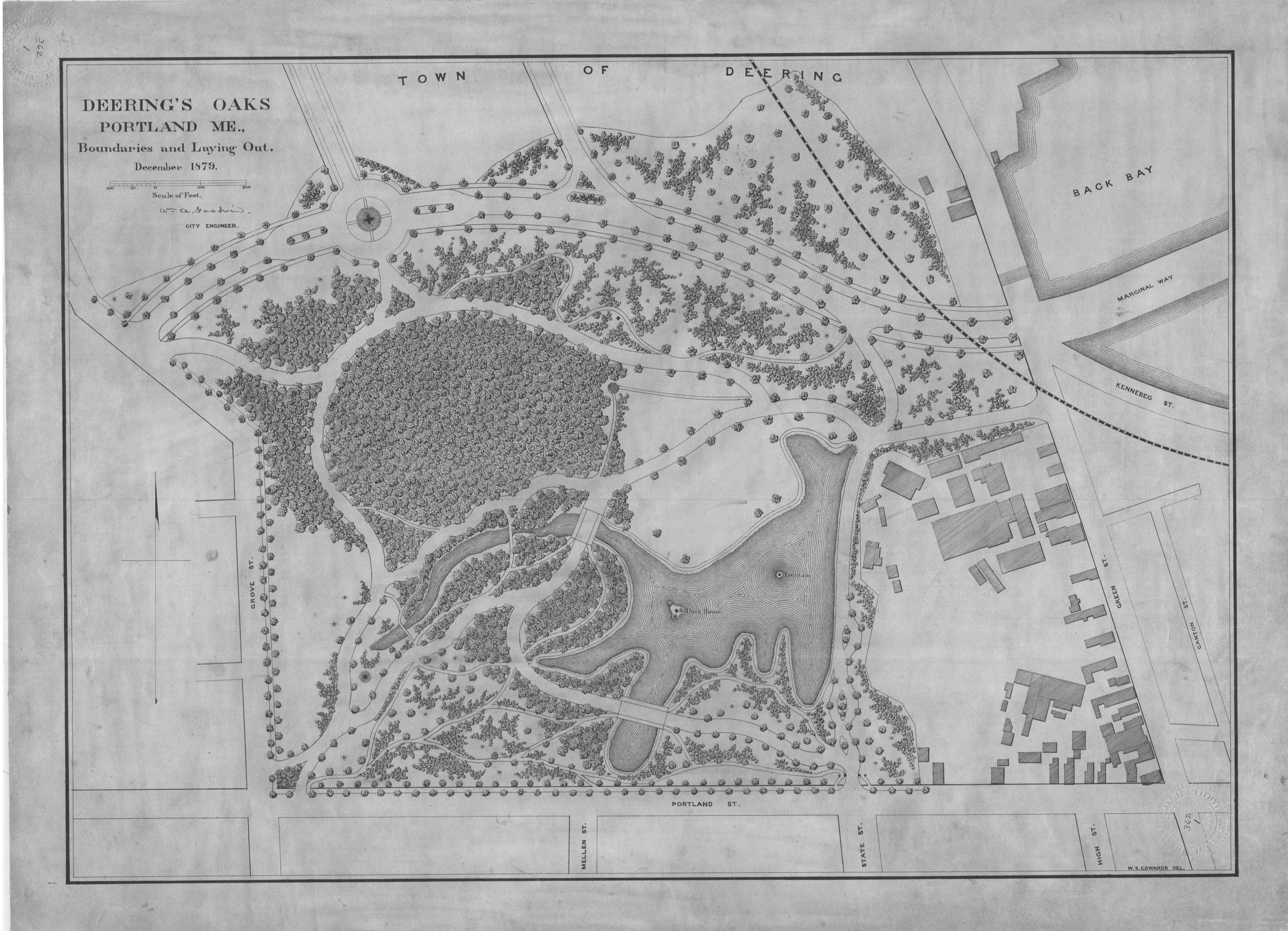
Map of Deering Oaks Park from December 1879

The site holds historical significance dating to the colonial period. During King William's War in September 1689, Benjamin Church assisted in defending British settlers at this location against forces from New France and tribes of the Wabanaki Confederacy in the Battle of Brackett's Wood. George Bramhall, for whom nearby Bramhall Hill is named, was among those killed in the conflict.

=== Establishment and design ===
The property was part of a larger estate owned by the Deering family since the early 19th century. Portland's city government had long expressed interest in acquiring the land for public use. In 1875, the Deering family proposed exchanging 50 acres (20 ha) of land for a tax abatement, an agreement the city formalized in 1879.

The park's development was overseen by William A. Goodwin, Portland's city engineer, implementing design principles from Frederick Law Olmsted's comprehensive master plan for the city's park system. Goodwin's original vision remains largely intact today, with the notable exception of a small northern section lost during the construction of Interstate 295 in the mid-20th century.

=== Environmental transformation ===
Deering Oaks Pond originally functioned as a tidal basin, naturally connected to Back Cove and filling and draining with ocean tides. This natural hydrological system was altered in the late 19th century to accommodate roadway construction, permanently separating the pond from tidal influence.

== Features and facilities ==
=== Recreational amenities ===
The park encompasses diverse recreational facilities serving Portland's community needs. Athletic facilities include baseball diamonds, tennis courts that have been upgraded multiple times since the park's establishment, and a modern playground area. The central pond provides seasonal recreational opportunities, historically supporting ice skating during winter months and paddle boat rentals during summer seasons until the late 1990s.

=== Deering Oaks Pond ===
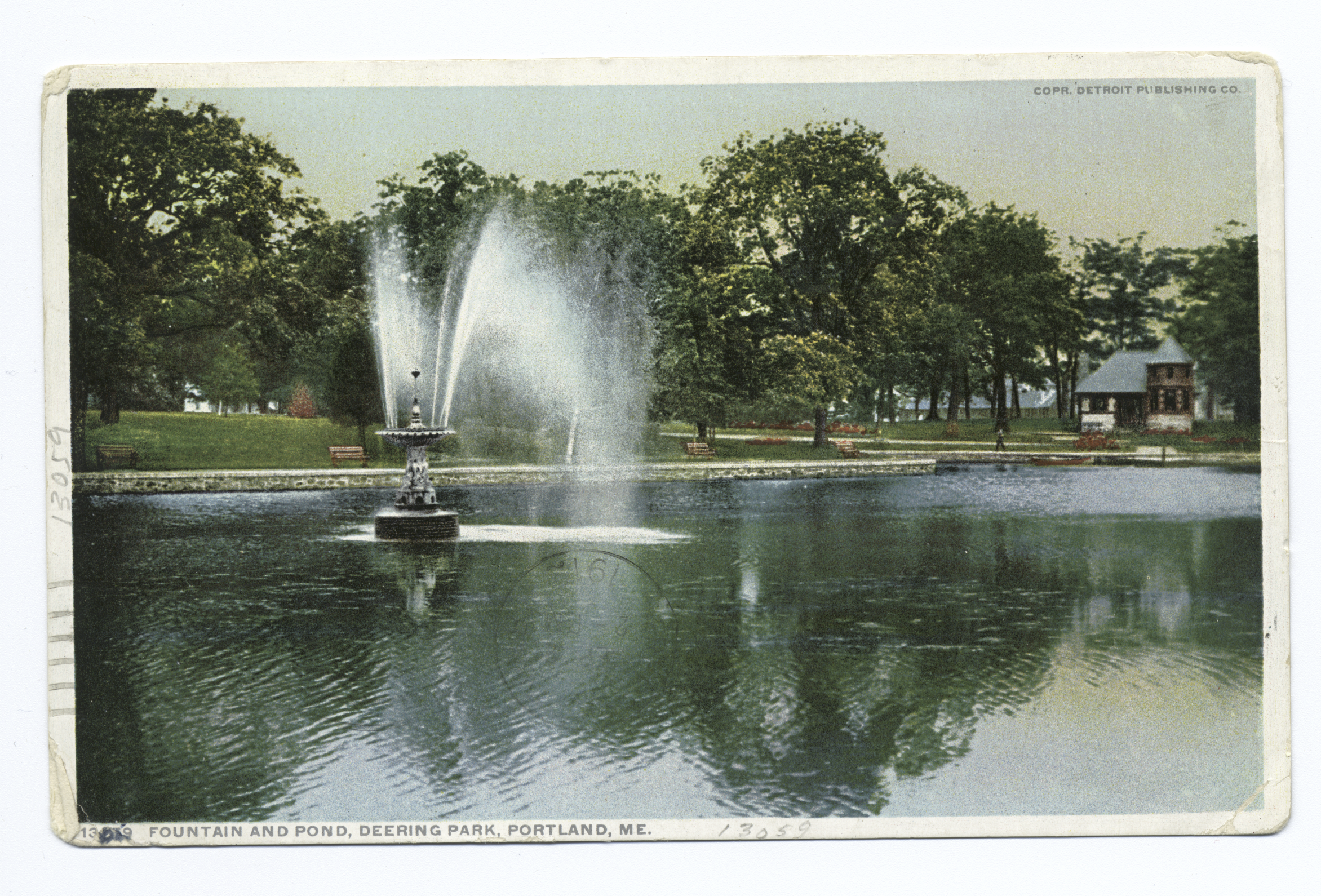
Early 20th century postcard showing the pond and fountain

The pond serves as the park's centerpiece and has undergone significant modifications since its natural origins. In 2010, Portland secured a federal grant of $1.2 million, with an additional local contribution of $540,000, to address water quality issues caused by seasonal algae blooms resulting from organic material accumulation. The project involved lining the pond bottom with cement to improve water quality and prevent structural damage, though this modification eliminated the pond's natural spring-fed ecosystem.

The pond gained national attention in 1996 when it served as a filming location for the movie "The Preacher's Wife," starring Whitney Houston and Denzel Washington. The production involved approximately 150 crew members and 140 local residents selected from 6,000 auditioners to serve as extras in winter scenes.

=== Castle-in-the-Park ===
The park's Castle-in-the-Park structure, built in 1894, originally served as a warming hut for ice skaters. Located adjacent to the pond on the State Street side, the building exemplifies Victorian architecture of the period. After decades of use as public restrooms, the structure underwent a comprehensive $675,000 restoration in 2004, funded by Friends of Deering Oaks, a community organization dedicated to park preservation. The restoration returned the building to its original Victorian design and function.

=== Deering Oaks Ravine ===
The Ravine functions as a children's aquatic play area adjacent to the main pond. Originally featuring a natural spring-fed stream, the area's hydrology was altered in the 1930s when nearby development affected the natural spring. The Portland Water District subsequently installed piping to maintain water flow from the Ravine to the pond. After the pool was declared a public health hazard and filled in during the 1950s, the area remained dormant until 21st-century redevelopment transformed it into a modern facility featuring a shallow granite-edged pool, splash pad, and reflecting pool sculpture. The centerpiece installation, "The Circle of Life" by artist Carole Hanson, incorporates carved stones in a ring formation.

=== Historical bridge ===
An arched footbridge spanning the Deering Oaks Ravine was constructed in 1911 at a cost of $3,355, replacing an earlier wooden structure. The 40-foot span featured distinctive 8-foot glass lamps on both sides. By 2007, engineering assessments determined that comprehensive restoration would require $216,000, leading to a multi-year capital improvement project funded from 2007-2009 with work beginning in 2010. The restoration included installation of decorative cast-iron street lamps designed to replicate the original fixtures, though modern versions utilize polycarbonate rather than glass to prevent vandalism.

== Modern developments ==
=== Master planning initiatives ===
In 1994, the Portland City Council unanimously approved the Deering Oaks Master Plan, establishing a framework for systematic park improvements. The plan prioritized closing State Street where it bisects the park and restoring the original entrance at State Street and Park Avenue. Between 1994 and 2004, the city invested $3 million in improvements including construction of a children's wading pool, conversion of Bowling Green Road to a pedestrian walkway, and upgrades to athletic facilities.

=== Community events and cultural significance ===
The park continues to serve as a venue for significant community gatherings. In 2010, Deering Oaks hosted a rally advocating for the repeal of the military's "Don't ask, don't tell" policy. The event, featuring singer Lady Gaga among other speakers, drew approximately 2,000 participants, demonstrating the park's ongoing role as a public forum for civic engagement.

The park houses Portland's monument to the Spanish–American War, featuring a casting of The Hiker by sculptor Theo Alice Ruggles Kitson. The Portland Farmers' Market operates from the Park Avenue side of the park, continuing the space's tradition as a community gathering place.

== National Register listing ==
Deering Oaks Park was added to the National Register of Historic Places on October 16, 1989, under reference number 89001708. The designation recognizes the park's significance as an example of 19th-century landscape architecture and its role in Frederick Law Olmsted's comprehensive urban planning vision for Portland.

== See also ==
- National Register of Historic Places listings in Portland, Maine
- Frederick Law Olmsted
