= Portland Railroad Company =

Trolleycar service in Maine, U.S.

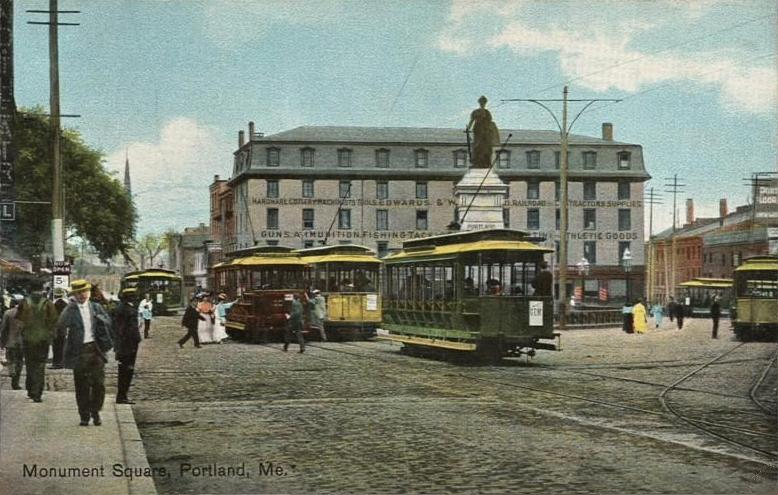
- Portland Railroad Company cars in Monument Square around 1909. From left to right, the three cars closest to the camera are running the Union Station-to-Grand Trunk Station route, the Deering route, and the Union Station-to-Munjoy Hill route

Operation
- Locale: Portland, Maine
- Open: 1860
- Close: 1941 (85 years ago)
- Status: Closed
- Owner: Portland Railroad Company

Portland Railroad Company (PRR) was a trolleycar service which operated in Portland, Maine, between 1860 and 1941.

== History ==
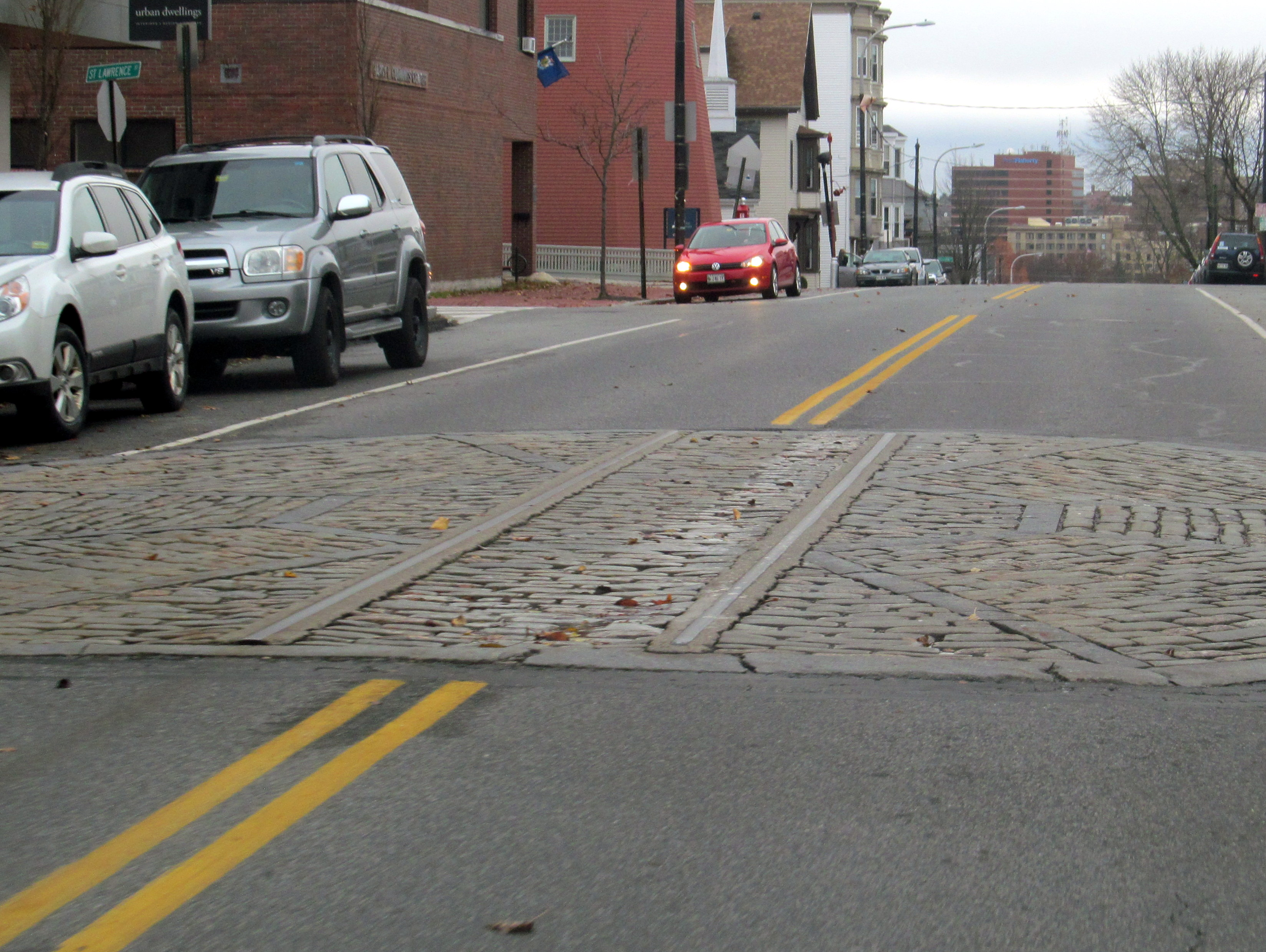
Track remnants along Congress Street on Munjoy Hill

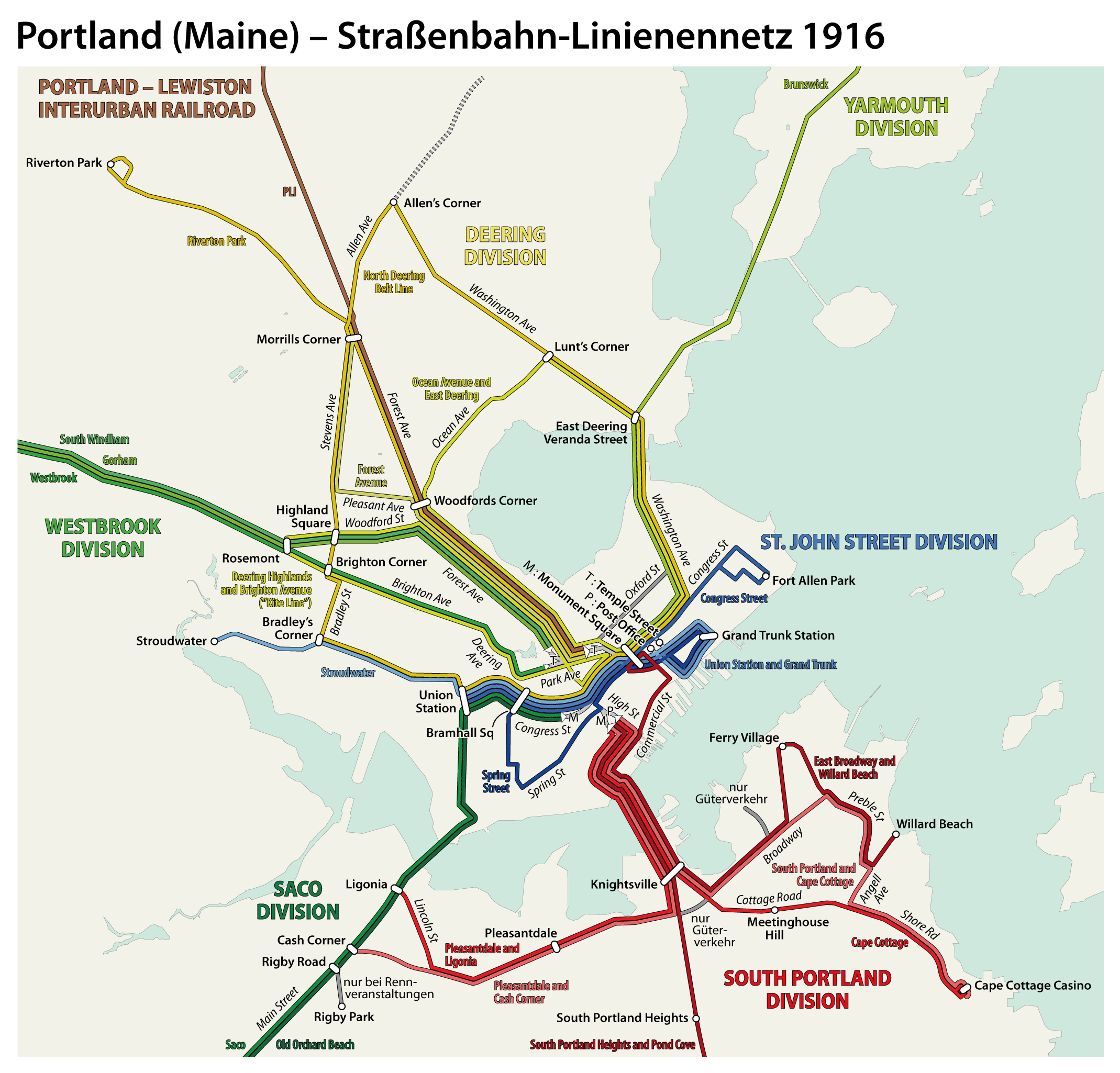
1916 map of Portland's electric railways

Portland & Forest Avenue Railroad Company (PFRC) was chartered in 1860 with the intent to build a streetcar line from Portland's Grand Trunk station on India Street. Construction was delayed by the American Civil War, but used rail was obtained from New Brunswick in 1863 to complete a line from India Street along Middle Street, to the main hub at Monument Square. From there, they traveled west along Congress Street, and then down High Street, and west along Spring Street to Clark Street, Pine Street and Congress Street, then back east along Congress Street to High Street. Service with horse-drawn streetcars began on October 12, 1863. In 1864, an adjoining line was built along Preble Street from Monument Square, then along Portland Street (today's Park Avenue) and Forest Avenue to Woodfords Corner. This line was later extended to Morrills Corner along Pleasant Avenue and Stevens Avenue. Lines along Congress Street were extended westward to Longfellow Square and eastward to Atlantic Street on Munjoy Hill. Horse-drawn sleighs were substituted for rail cars when snow and ice covered the streets during winter months to avoid ice removal inconveniencing other horse-drawn sleighs.

The company's name was shortened to the Portland Railroad Company (PRR) in 1865. The Congress Street line was extended past Union Station to Stroudwater Village. A new line was built from Woodfords Corner through Lunts Corner to East Deering. Additional lines were constructed along Commercial Street and Pearl Street from the Grand Trunk station to Congress Street. The Portland Railroad Company extended service through Westbrook (via Forest Avenue, Woodfords Corner and Evergreen Cemetery on Stevens Avenue, initially, then to Morrills Corner) to South Windham and Gorham by acquisition of the Westbrook, Windham & Naples Railway. Connection with the Lewiston, Augusta & Waterville Street Railway at Yarmouth was made by acquisition of the Portland & Yarmouth Electric Railway through Falmouth Foreside and Cumberland Foreside. A planned connection with the Biddeford & Saco Railway was begun by the acquisition of the Portland & Cape Elizabeth Railway, but the route through South Portland to Old Orchard and Saco seemingly never came to fruition. Back in downtown Portland, a section of line was constructed along Congress Street to Atlantic Street on Munjoy Hill. In 1890, the line was extended through Wilson Street and Beckett Street to Fort Allen Park on the Eastern Promenade, bringing the total line mileage to 14.9 miles (24.0 km). A large carhouse was built on Beckett Street.

By 1874, PRR owned 26 trolleycars and 82 horses. Carhouses and stables were in existence at the corner of Spring Street and Clark Street by 1877. Thirteen years later, PRR owned fifty cars and 225 horses.

In 1882, another expansion occurred, taking in the wharves along Commercial Street after departing India Street. The trolleycars then turned onto Pearl Street and back to Middle Street. A line was also built. by the Ocean Street Railroad, from Morrills Corner along Ocean Avenue to Lunts Corner on Washington Avenue. The line was not profitable and was taken over by PRR in 1885 (electrified in 1896).

Tracks were extended in 1887 from Clark Street, along Spring Street to Neal Street, Carroll Street, Vaughn Street and Bramhall Street in the city's Western Promenade, before connecting back to Congress Street at Bramhall Square.

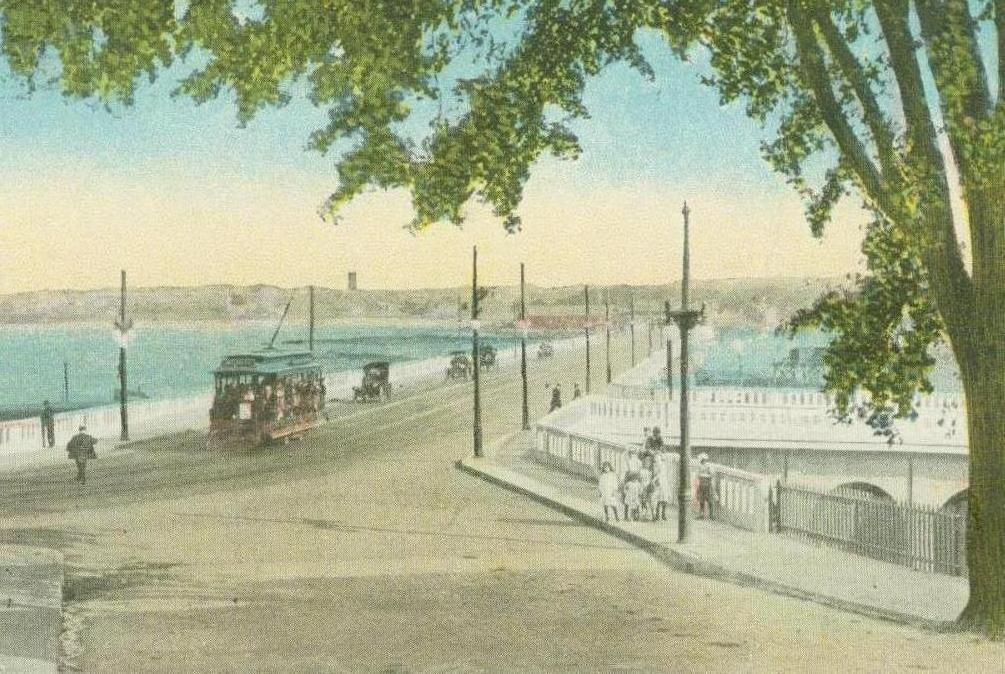
A streetcar crossing the Million Dollar Bridge between Portland and South Portland shortly after its 1916 opening

Portland's Union Station was opened on St. John Street in June 1888, shortly after which PRR extended tracks from Longfellow Square along St. John Street to Railroad Square. Another extension occurred to Bradley's Corner (between the Libbytown and Rosemont neighborhoods), bringing the mileage of the line to 15.7 miles (25.3 km).

From 1914 to 1933, the Portland–Lewiston Interurban entered Portland via the Portland Railroad line from Morrills Corner.

Electrification through overhead wires began in the late 19th century, starting with the Deering line. Route changes included bypassing steam railroad grade crossings on Parris Street and Kennebec Street in Portland's Bayside neighborhood by extending PRR's tracks on Portland Street to Forest Avenue, then to the corner of Kennebec Street. The first electric trolleycar began service between Morrills Corner and Woodfords Corner in June 1891. PRR staved off competition from the Portland & Westbrook Street Railway to provide service to Westbrook.

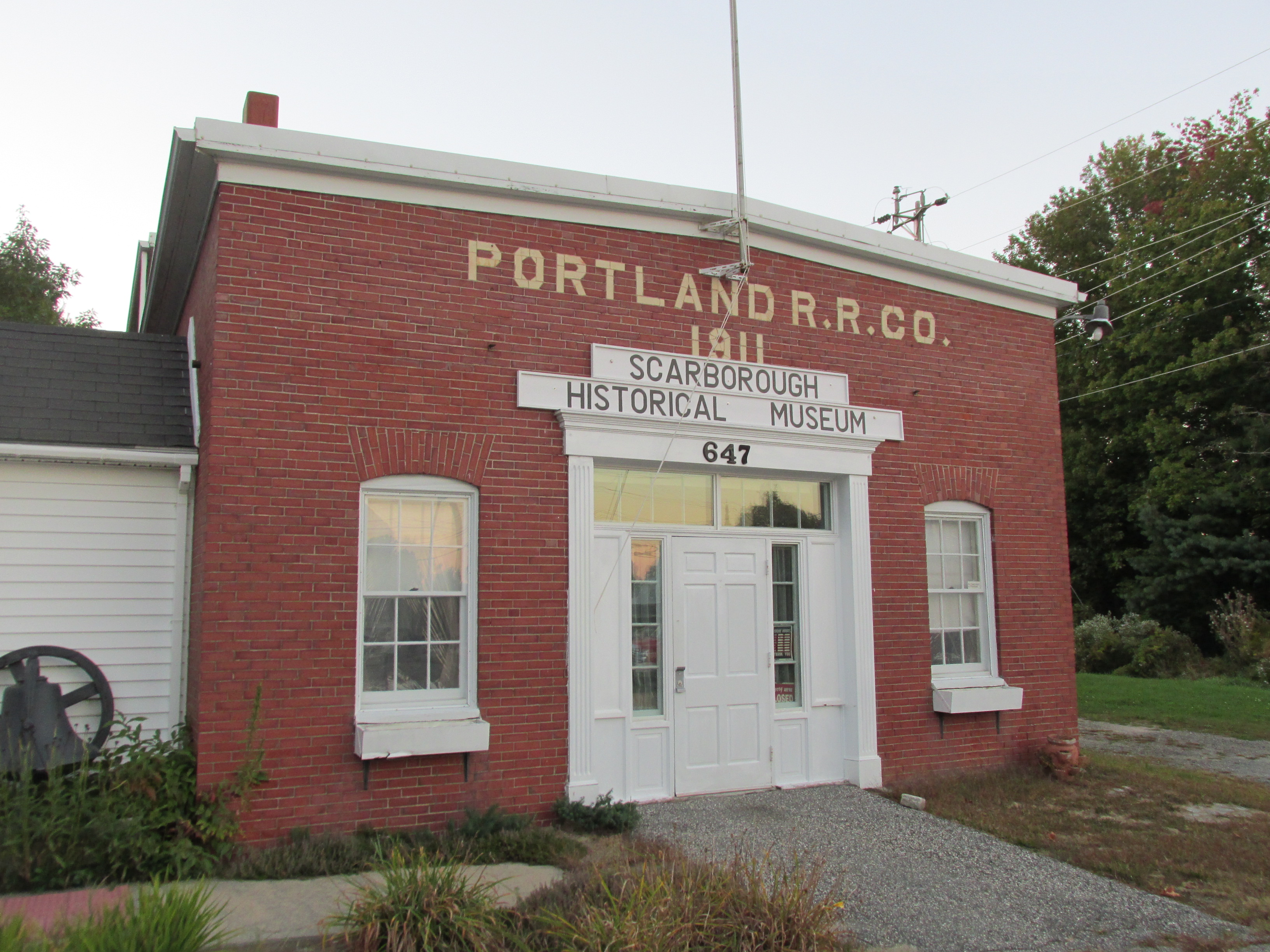
Portland Railroad Company Substation, built in 1911, in Scarborough, Maine

In 1894, a short extension was made from Lunts Corner to East Deering post office via Washington Avenue, followed by an extension from Fort Allen Park through Morning Street to Congress Street, then along Congress to complete a loop to Atlantic Avenue. On the Stroudwater line, rails were laid west from Railroad Square on St. John Street to today's Park Avenue, passing beneath Maine Central Railroad's trestle bridge, then along Park Avenue to connect to the existing line at Congress Street.

The last horse-drawn car ran in December 1895, by which point there was 21.67 miles (34.87 km) of single-track lines.

Increasing automobile ownership made electric railway travel less convenient through the 1920s. The lines to Yarmouth, Gorham, South Windham, Old Orchard, and Saco were abandoned between 1931 and 1933. The remaining system operated as a city traction system until a major service contraction in 1939 and complete replacement by buses in the spring of 1941.

== Liveries ==
For many years, the trolleycars were painted different colors, relating to the line (later, the division) on which they operated:

- light green: Union Station to Munjoy Hill
- blue: Spring Street to Grand Trunk Station
- red: Union Station to Grand Trunk Station
- red (alternative): Stroudwater (later South Portland)
- yellow: Deering (later Yarmouth; changed to green)
- brown: Westbrook (later dark green)

A single paint scheme of a red body with white and blue trim was adopted around 1920.

== See also ==
- Railroad history of Portland, Maine
- Public transportation in Maine
- Edward A. Newman, general manager of Portland Railroad Company
