= Paul J. Ledman =

American historian

- Born: New York City, U.S.
- Occupation: Historian
- Notable work: Portland, Maine: Connections Across Time; Walking Through History: Portland, Maine on Foot; A Maine Town Responds: Cape Elizabeth and South Portland in the Civil War

Paul J. Ledman is an American historian and author based in Portland, Maine. He has written several books on the history of Portland, notably Walking Through History: Portland, Maine on Foot in 2016.

== Early life ==
Ledman was born in New York City, where he graduated from Stuyvesant High School in 1967. He then graduated with a Bachelor of Arts in geology from Binghamton University in 1971, a Masters of Arts in history from the University of New Hampshire in 1999, and a Juris Doctor degree from New York Law School in 1982. He passed the New York State Bar in 1983. He worked as an officer of Blazing Eagles Corporation.

Aside from being a writer, Ledman has had careers in geology, law, real estate and teaching.

== Personal life ==
Ledman moved to Maine in 1990, and now lives on Munjoy Hill in Portland with his wife Colleen.

== Bibliography ==
Ledman has published three books:

- A Maine Town Responds: Cape Elizabeth and South Portland in the Civil War (2002)
- Walking Through History: Portland, Maine on Foot (2016)
- Portland, Maine: Connections Across Time (2023)
