= Portland Farmers Market =

The Portland Farmers Market may refer to:

1. Portland Farmers' Market (Maine)
2. Portland Farmers Market (Oregon)
