= Fort Sumner (disambiguation) =

Fort Sumner may refer to:

- Fort Sumner, a historic fort in New Mexico
- Fort Sumner, New Mexico, a town near the fort in New Mexico
- Fort Sumner Municipal Airport, an airport for the town in New Mexico
- Fort Sumner (Maryland), a Civil War fort in Bethesda, Maryland near Washington, D.C.
- Fort Sumner (Maine), a former First System fort in Portland, Maine
- Fort Sumner Park, a city park on the site of Fort Sumner, Portland, Maine

== Other similar sounding ==
- Fort Sumter, a fort in Charleston, South Carolina where the Civil War began
