= David Brenerman =

American politician

David H. Brenerman (born March 10, 1951) is an American politician from Maine. Brenerman, a Democrat, served three terms (1978-1984) in the Maine House of Representatives. He also served for three years on Portland's City Council, which included a year as ceremonial mayor. In 2013, he retired after working since 1984 with Unum. He was subsequently hired by Martin's Point Health Care as a consultant.

Brenerman grew up on Munjoy Hill and graduated from Portland High School in 1969 and Clark University in 1973. He also earned a Master's in Public Administration from the University of Maine.

In 2014, Brenerman announced he would seek to replace the retiring John Coyne for District 5 on Portland's City Council. On November 4, Brenerman won the District 5 seat unopposed. On December 1, he was sworn in as a member of the Portland, Maine City Council.
