= J.J. Nissen Bakery building =

Historic building in Portland, Maine

The J.J. Nissen Bakery building is an historic bakery building in Portland, Maine, USA. Located at 75 Washington Avenue on Munjoy Hill, it was built in 1924 for the John J. Nissen Baking Company. In August 1995, the building was purchased by philanthropist Elizabeth Noyce. The bakery, which was one the largest in New England for much of the twentieth-century, ceased production in 1999. Thereafter the structure was converted in office space.
