= Battle of Brackett's Wood =

1689 battle

Coordinates: 43.659°N 70.271°W

Location	Deering Oaks Park
Result	English victory

Belligerents
Massachusetts Bay Colony; English allied Natives	Wabanaki Confederacy

Commanders and leaders
Benjamin Church	Unknown

Strength
250	Unknown

Casualties and losses
21	Unknown

The Battle of Brackett's Wood was fought on September 21, 1689 between the Native Americans, who had allied with the French, and English colonials, outside the town of Falmouth (present day Portland, Maine). It was part of King William's War.

When 700 French-allied warriors were spotted at what is now Peaks Island the local settlers feared raiding would soon follow. Urgent pleas for assistance were carried to the colonial authorities in Boston, Massachusetts —Maine was in those times considered to be within the boundaries of Massachusetts. 160 men, including some native fighters allied with the Massachusetts Bay Colony (later renamed the Province of Massachusetts), were sent to protect the small 25 family settlement, commanded by Benjamin Church (he is considered the forebear of the modern day United States Army Rangers).

Church learned from a "redeemed woman" that the French-Allied Indians were planning an attack on the settlement. She was being held as a captive aboard a small Dutch merchant ship along the coast of Maine.

Today Brackett's wood is known as Deering Oaks. In those times it was part of a farm owned by the commander of the local garrison.
