= Edward A. Newman =

- Newman pictured around 1905
- Born: January 9, 1853; Maine, United States
- Died: May 20, 1909 (aged 56); Portland, Maine, U.S.
- Resting place: Evergreen Cemetery, Portland, Maine, U.S.
- Occupation: Businessman
- Known for: Former general manager of the Portland Railroad Company
- Spouse: Marie A. Newman (–1909; his death)

Edward A. Newman (January 9, 1853 – May 20, 1909) was an American businessman from Portland, Maine. He was general manager of the Portland Railroad Company and vice-president of the New England Street Railway Club.

He was well known among the street railway community of the United States, and during his tenure, Portland's streetcar service was recognized as the best in the country.

== Early life ==
Newman was the son of Edward Newman, a well-known citizen of the Deering neighborhood of Portland. He had two sisters: Mary and Abbie. His father died in 1898.

He grew up in Westbrook, Maine, where he attended the public school, followed by Westbrook Seminary.

== Career ==
In 1875, he joined, as a clerk, the office of the Portland Railroad Company. The following year, he was elected treasurer of the company, assisting Harrison J. Libby in overseeing the railroad's operation.

Newman succeeded George W. Soule as superintendent.

He was a 32nd-degree Freemason, a member of Deering Lodge, F. and A. M., Portland Commandery, Knights Templar and to Fraternity Lodge I. O. O. F. of Woodfords.

== Death ==
Newman died of heart failure on May 20, 1909. He was 56. His funeral, officiated by Rev. Ernest A. Pressey, was held three days later at his Highland Street home, in Woodfords Corner, with over five hundred attendees. At 3.30 PM, all services of the railroad were suspended for two minutes as a mark of respect for Newman.

He is interred in Portland's Evergreen Cemetery. He was joined there by his wife, Marie, who survived him by 24 years. Their daughter, Ethel, followed in 1956.
