= Munjoy Hill =

Area of Portland, Maine, US

Coordinates: 43°40′02″N 70°14′56″W

Munjoy Hill Mount Joy (formerly)
- Neighborhood of Portland, Maine
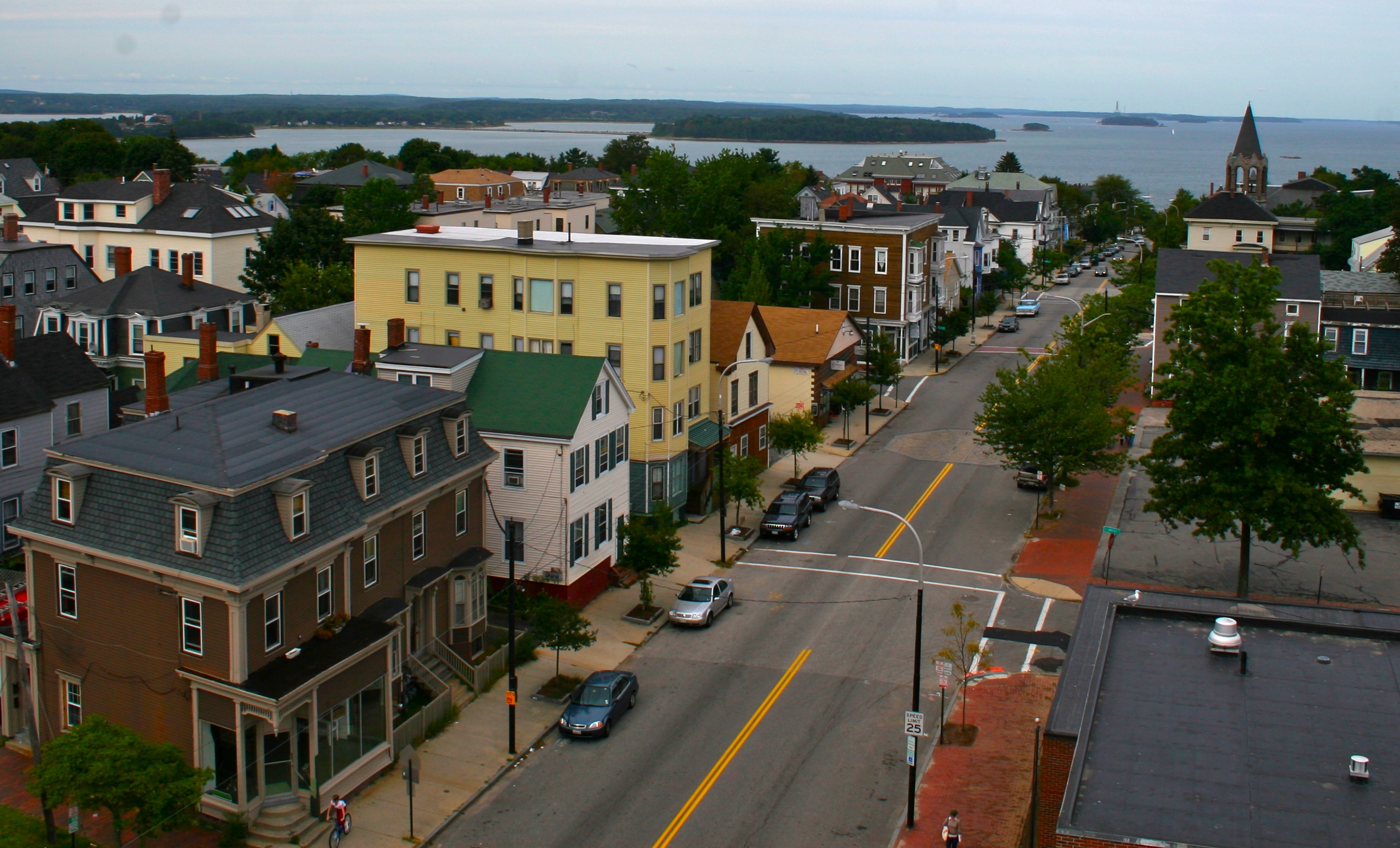
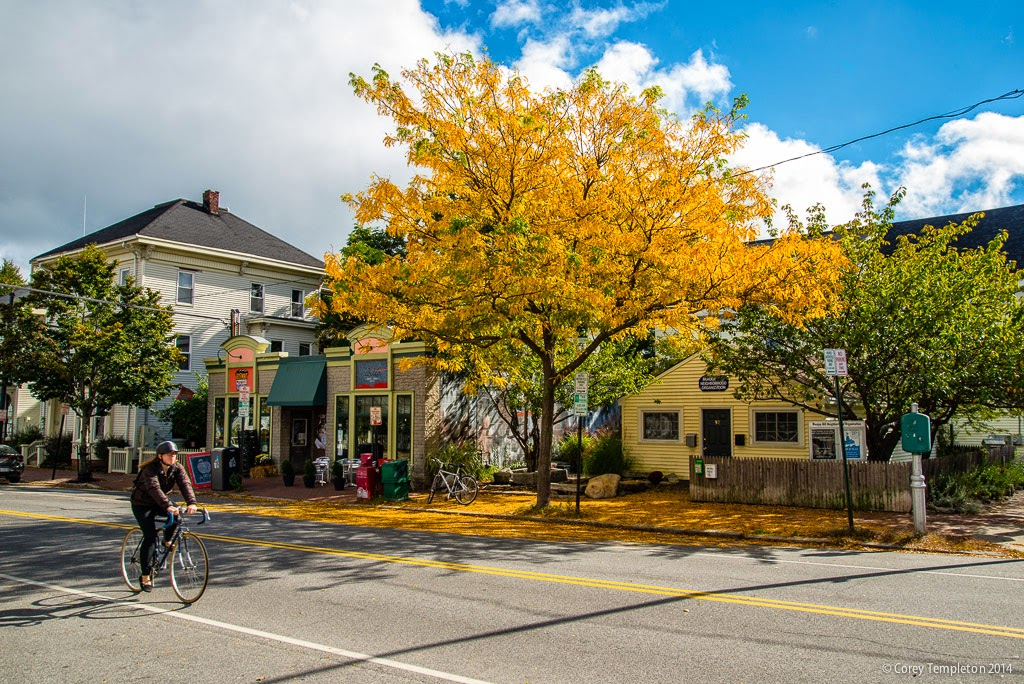
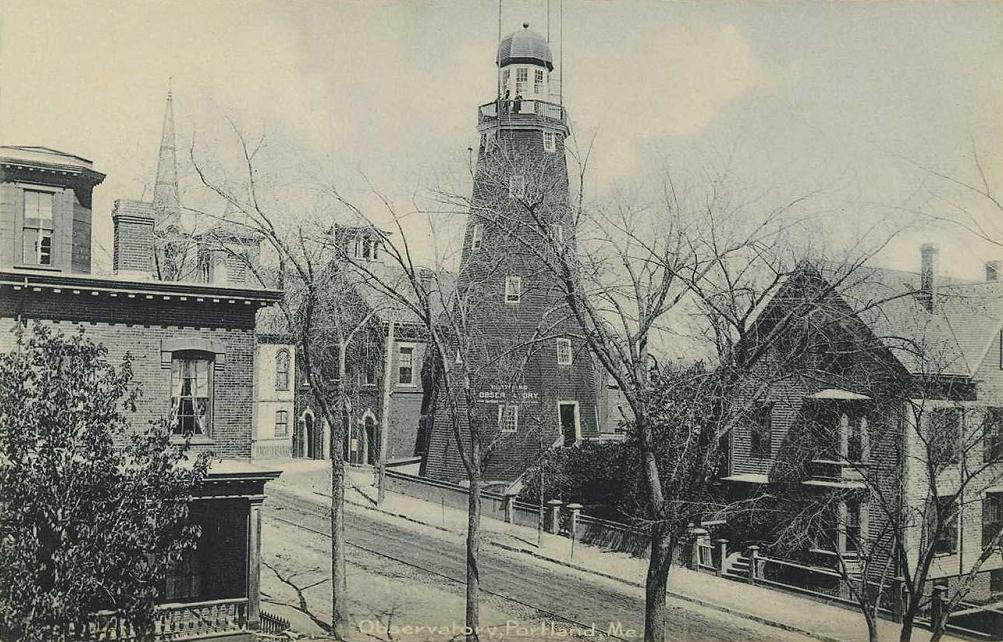
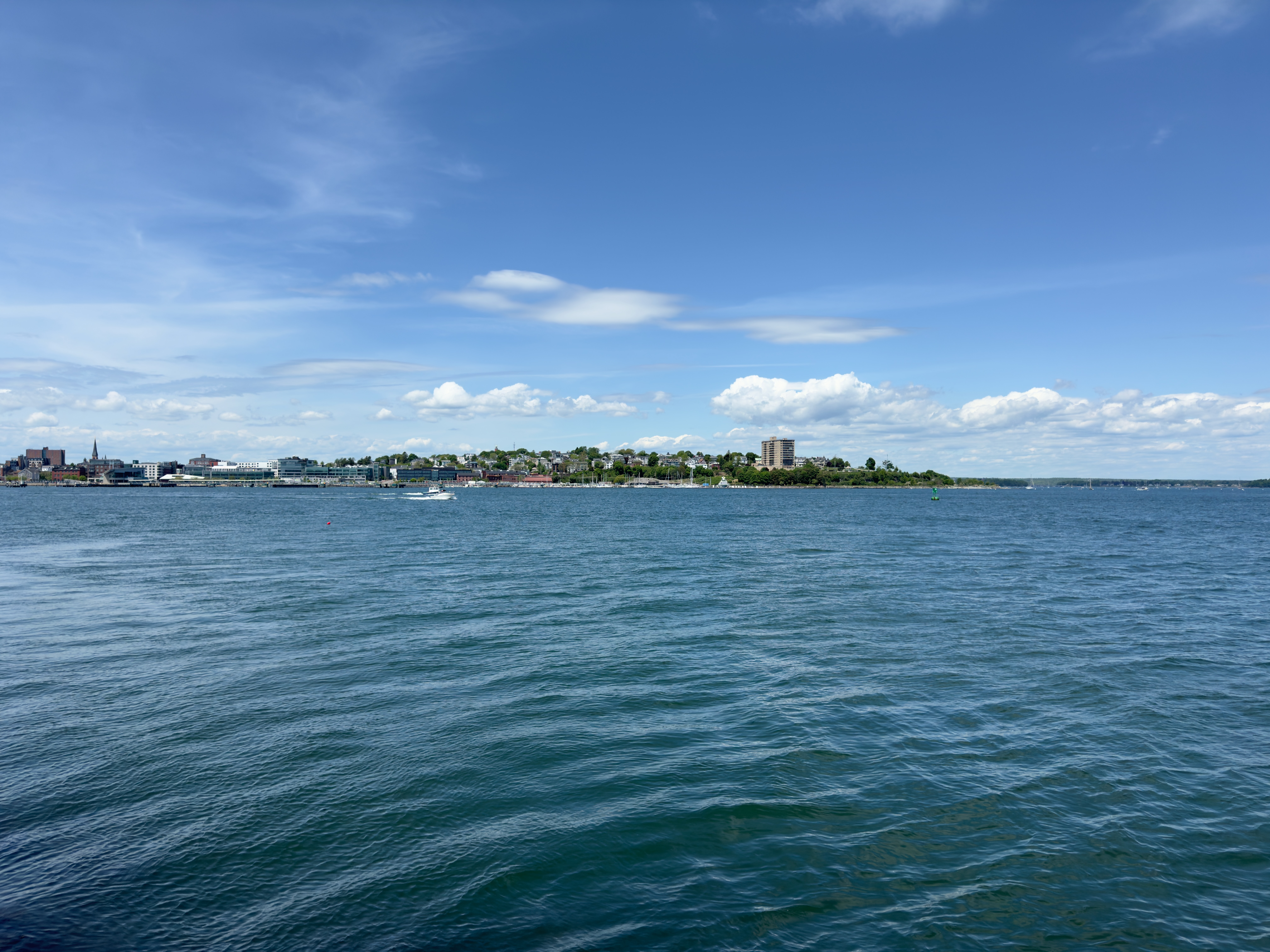
- Top: from the Portland Observatory looking northeast on Congress Street; middle top: Munjoy Hill Neighborhood Organization Hill House in 2010; middle bottom: Portland Observatory c. 1910 bottom: the Munjoy Hill skyline, viewed from the southeast in 2024
- Interactive map of Munjoy Hill
- Country: United States
- City: Portland, Maine
- Elevation: 161 ft (49 m)
- Postal code: ZIP Code

Munjoy Hill is a neighborhood and prominent geographical feature of Portland, Maine. It is located east of downtown and south of East Deering. In the nineteenth and twentieth centuries, the neighborhood had a large Irish and Italian American population.

The neighborhood is named for George Munjoy, who settled near the intersection of Mountfort Street and Fore Street.

The neighborhood became known as "Mount Joy" for a period of the early 19th century, before reverting to "Munjoy".

Looking north to Back Cove from Congress Street (2019)

Looking southeast down Waterville Street toward Casco Bay, with Bug Light and (in the far right-hand corner) Portland Head Light

== Geography ==
At the northeastern end of Portland's peninsula, Munjoy Hill, at 161 feet (49 m), overlooks the downtown and harbor to the south, Casco Bay and its islands to the east and north, and shallow Back Cove to the west. The Eastern Promenade rings the neighborhood and offers panoramic views of these features, as well as two lighthouses, Mason Station power plant, and the stone battlement of Fort Gorges.

While densely settled, it is largely residential and, due to the shape of the peninsula, it is isolated from the major commuter routes. Congress Street, downtown Portland's main artery, ends quietly at Eastern Promenade. Washington Avenue, crossing from the other side of Back Cove, might be considered the boundary of the neighborhood, with Fox Street and India Street areas merging into the downtown and Bayside areas.

The most significant land feature of Munjoy Hill is Eastern Promenade, a park designed by the Olmsted Brothers design firm, as was Baxter Boulevard, which rings part of Back Cove. This Olmsted park has water vistas wrapping from the sunset view at the Loring Memorial above the shore for over a mile, to a sunrise view over the Casco Bay and Portland Head Light, and ending at Fort Allen Park with a full sweep of Portland Harbor. The park includes a series of broad rolling fields, public gardens, monuments, playgrounds and ball courts on top of the bluff and, along the waterfront, East End Beach, picnic areas, and a municipal boat launch. The Maine Narrow Gauge Railroad Co. & Museum operates two-foot gauge steam and diesel tourist trains along the Casco Bay shore of the peninsula. The Eastern Promenade Trail, which begins in South Portland, runs next to the railroad line and connects with the Back Cove Trail, all suitable for walking, running, and cycling. The small public beach is a favorite of kayakers, families, and, after 5 PM, dog owners and their pets. The launch is often used to ferry heavy equipment to the city's outlying islands. Near the northern end of the Eastern Promenade, a monument to Korean War pilot Charles J. Loring, Jr. offers sunset viewing over Back Cove, plus an occasional glimpse of Mount Washington, about 70 miles (110 km) away in New Hampshire's White Mountains.

East End Beach is a small beach on the eastern side of Munjoy Hill.

== Prominent buildings ==
At the center of Munjoy Hill, on the crest of the hill (between Kellogg and St. Lawrence Streets), are the Portland Observatory and the neighborhood fire station (housing Engine 1, Ladder 1, and Ladder 5).

Housing in the neighborhood is a mix of single- and multi-family structures. There are many triple-deckers, especially on Vesper, Morning, and North Streets. Many of these are rental units, with some condominiums. Only a small proportion have more than three units.

Until March 2006, the neighborhood had two elementary schools, Jack Elementary School and the Marada Adams School. Jack was found to be contaminated with mold, and was closed and demolished. Its students were relocated to other city schools pending the construction of a unified East End School to replace both Jack and Adams. The East End School opened to students in September 2006. The local polling place and public library branch services from the Adams school were moved to the East End School as well. The Portland Public Library's Munjoy Hill branch, within the East End school, was closed in 2010. The space now holds the school's own library.

There is a small, arts-based, neighborhood preschool, on Lafayette Street, called The Schoolhouse.

The Hill Arts (formerly St. Lawrence Arts Center) is home to Good Theater Productions and other arts events year-round.

The J.J. Nissen Bakery building is an historic bakery located at 75 Washington Avenue. It was built in 1924 for the John J. Nissen Baking Company. In August 1995, the building was purchased by philanthropist Elizabeth Noyce. The bakery, which was the largest in New England for much of the twentieth-century, ceased production in 1999. Thereafter the structure was converted into office space.

== Education ==
Beginning in 2006, the neighborhood was served by the East End Community School, which was built following the closure of Jack Elementary and Marada Adams schools.

== Parks ==
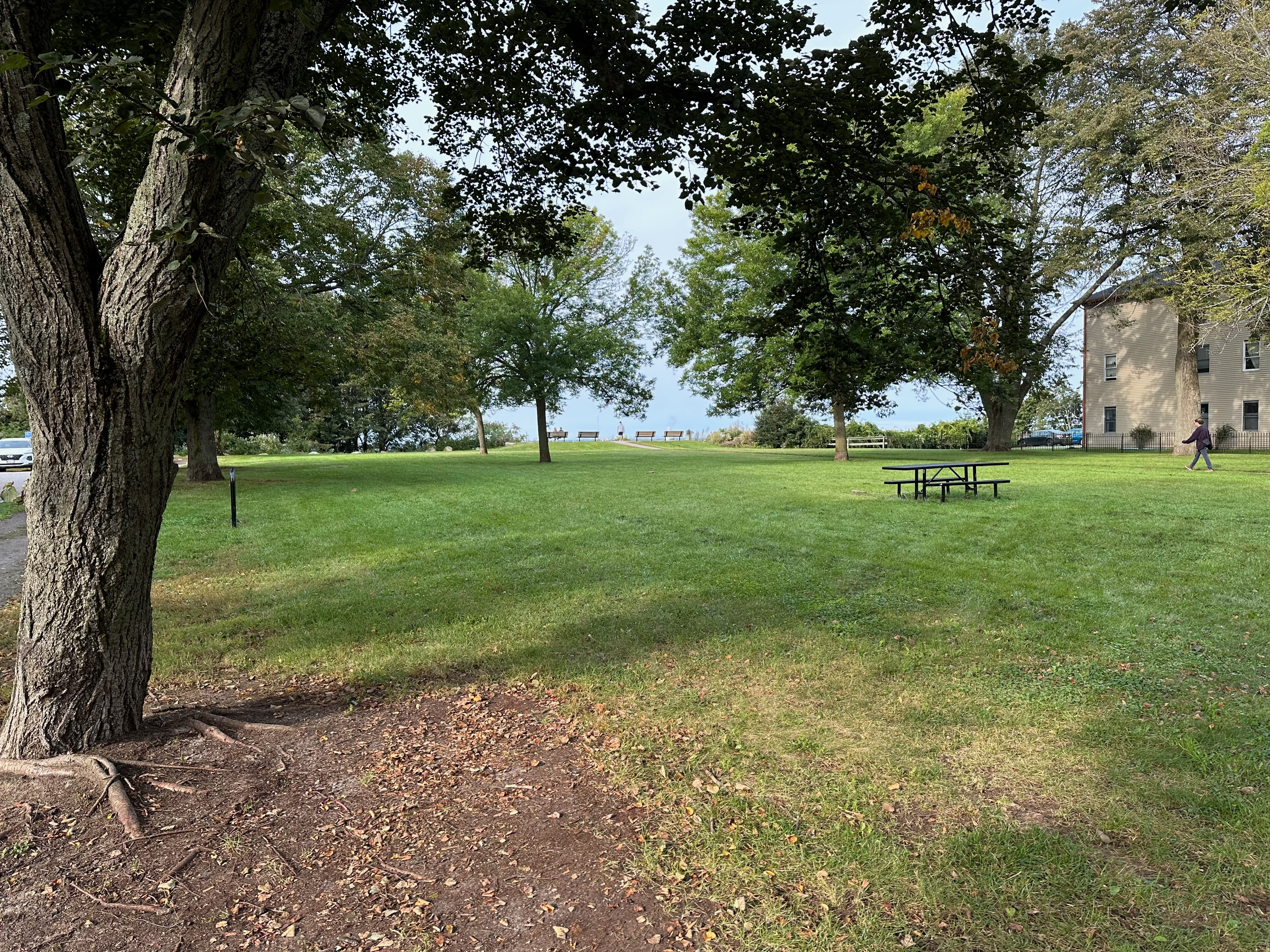
Fort Sumner Park

Munjoy Hill is home to a number of parks. The Eastern Promenade is one of Portland's most scenic and highly used public spaces. Other parks include Fort Sumner Park (also called Standpipe Park) on North Street. The park is now privately owned, and the origin of the name is unknown. In the 1950s and 1960s, or perhaps earlier, neighbors referred to it as "Shailer Park", likely due to its being next door to Shailer School. When publicly owned, it was officially Fort Sumner Park, named for the fort which had been located there. (The area at the end of North Street named erroneously on many maps as Fort Sumner Park is Loring Memorial Park. There was a standpipe in the area, but it, and a reservoir, was located at the corner of North and Walnut Street, where there are now apartments.)

Fort Allen Park overlooks Casco Bay on the Eastern Promenade.

== Streets ==
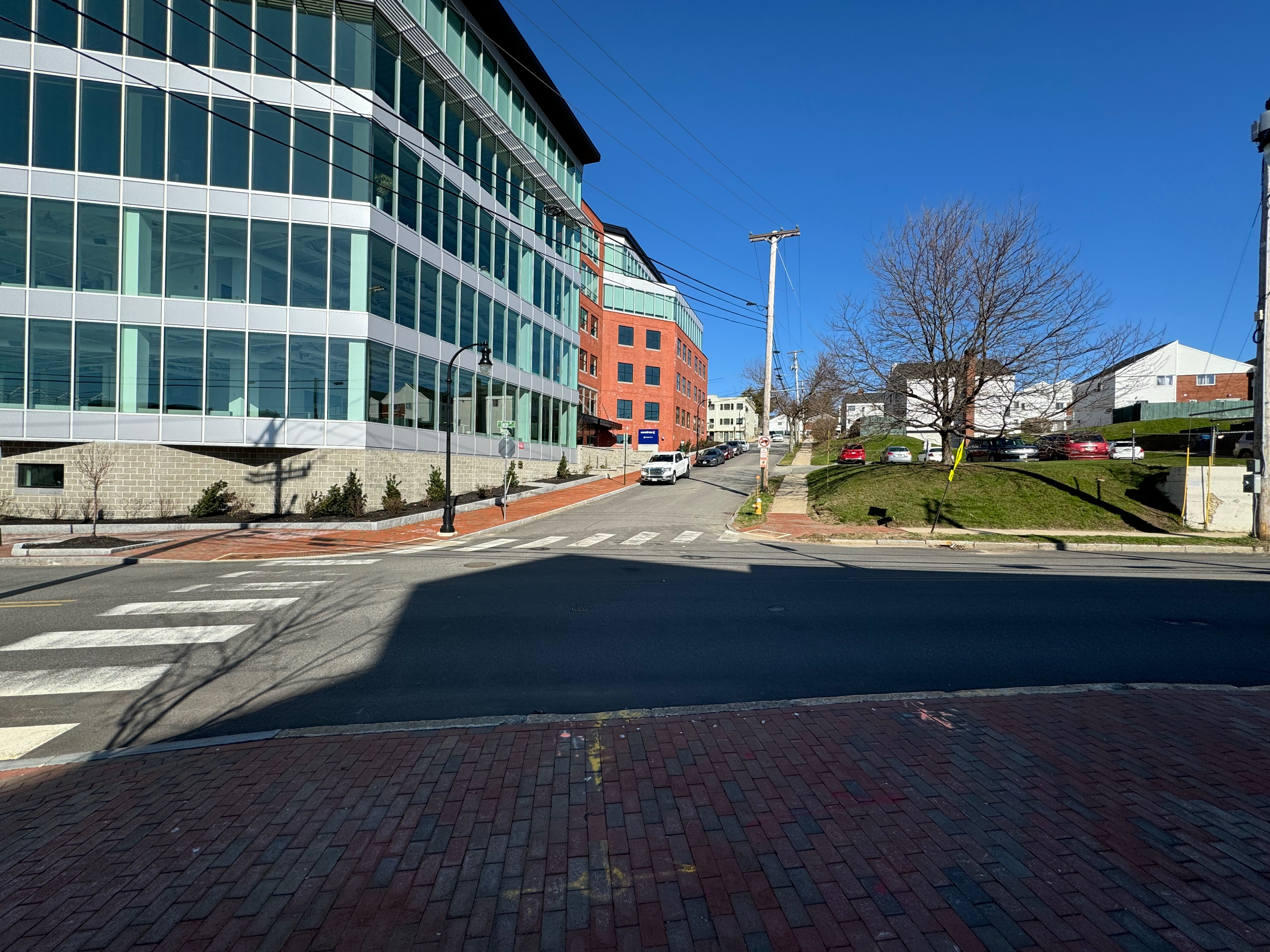
The foot of Mountfort Street, at Fore Street, where George Munjoy lived

Mountfort Street runs for around 0.22 miles (0.35 km), from Congress Street, at the foot of Munjoy Hill, in the northwest to Fore Street in the southeast. It forms the eastern boundary of Eastern Cemetery, which was established in 1668.

George Munjoy (c. 1626–1680), for whom Munjoy Hill is named, lived in a fortified house, known as Munjoy's Garrison, near the corner of Mountfort Street and Fore Street, which was then at the shoreline. Munjoy had moved north from the Massachusetts Bay Colony in 1659 to what was then Falmouth, Province of Maine.

The street is believed to have been named for Edmund Mountfort (1694–1737), a merchant who arrived in Portland from Boston in 1728. The family of Daniel Mountfort, meanwhile, built a home around the Mountfort/Fore Street intersection at the beginning of the 19th century.

The home of Charles Frederick, Harriet Stephenson Eastman and Alexander Stephenson, at the corner of Mountfort and Newbury Streets, is denoted by a stone marker of the Portland Freedom Trail.

After the American Civil War, the Eagle Sugar Refinery was established on Fore Street at the foot of Mountfort Street. Located adjacent to the Portland Company locomotive foundry, it was well positioned to distribute its goods efficiently. Sugarcane arrived into the refinery warehouse from Cuba via ships that docked at the local wharves. It remained in business until 1891.

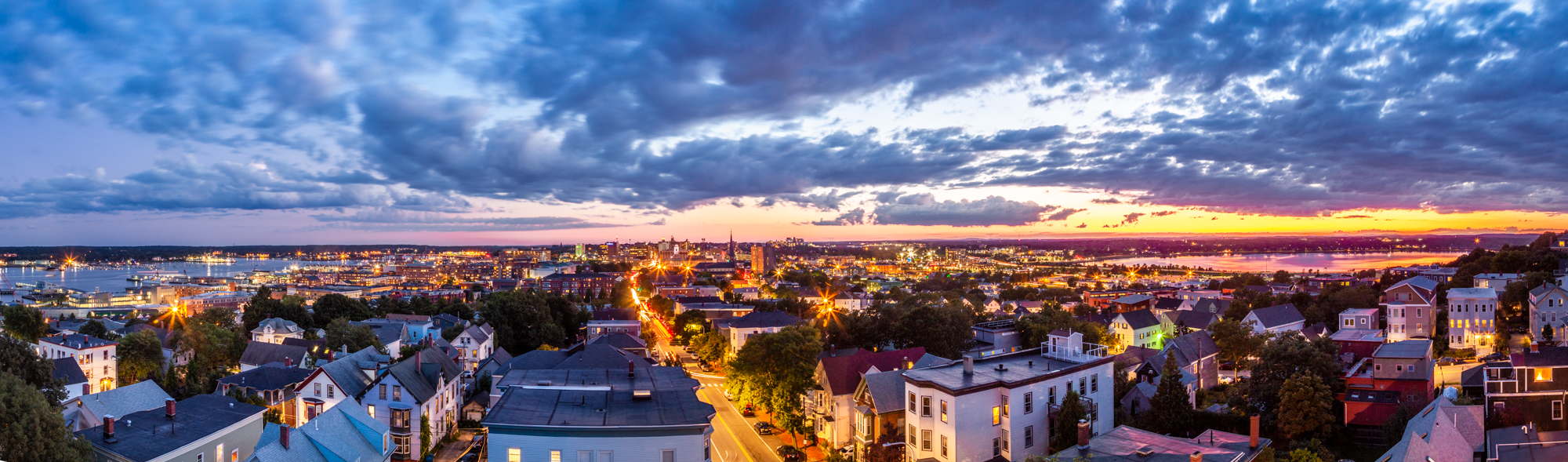
A panoramic aerial view, looking west

== Notable residents ==
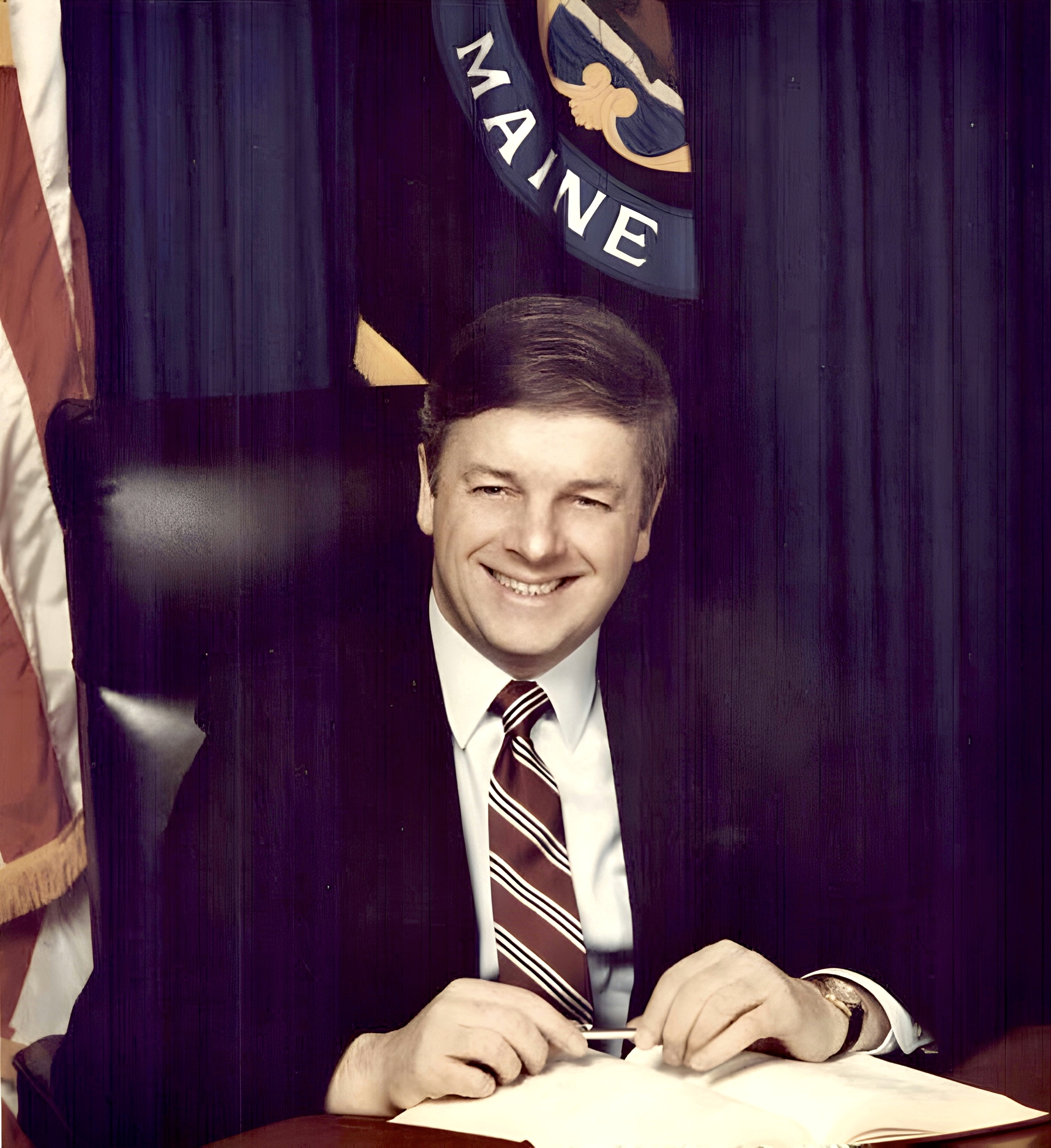
Joseph E. Brennan, former Governor of Maine, grew up on Munjoy Hill

- Justin Alfond, state legislator
- David Brenerman, politician
- Joseph E. Brennan, Governor of Maine (1979–87) and Congressman (1987–91)
- Benjamin F. Dudley, state legislator
- John Ford, film director
- J. Elizabeth Mitchell, state legislator and healthcare advocate
- Anne Rand, state legislator
- Diane Russell, state legislator

== See also ==
- Seacoast defense in the United States
- Portland Railroad Company
