= Anne Rand =

American politician (born 1946)

Member of the Maine House of Representatives from Munjoy Hill
- In office December 2006 – December 2008
- Preceded by: Benjamin F. Dudley
- Succeeded by: Diane Russell
- In office December 1986 – December 1994
- Succeeded by: J. Elizabeth Mitchell

Personal details
- Born: July 27, 1946 (age 80) Portland, Maine
- Party: Democratic
- Spouse: Dale Rand
- Education: Maine School of Practical Nursing
- Profession: Nurse

Anne M. Rand (born July 27, 1946) is an American politician from Maine. She served in the Maine House of Representatives and the Maine State Senate for 10 terms between 1986 and 2008.

Rand was born in Portland, Maine and raised in the city's Munjoy Hill neighborhood. She graduated from the Maine School of Practical Nursing in Waterville, Maine in 1970. She worked as a nurse at Mercy Hospital for 15 years prior to entering politics. She was first elected to the Maine House of Representatives in 1986, where she served until giving up her seat to run for Maine State Senate in 1994. She was replaced in the House of Representatives by J. Elizabeth Mitchell (not to be confused with Libby Mitchell).

In 1988, Rand was a delegate to the 1988 Democratic National Convention, where she supported Jesse Jackson.

In 1995, Rand made headlines for sponsoring a bill to make marijuana legal for patients with HIV-AIDS.

She was elected to the State Senate in 1994 and served until 2002, when she was unable to run for re-election due to term-limits. She ran and won her old seat on Munjoy Hill in 2006. She sought her old seat on the Maine Senate in 2008, but lost in the Democratic primary to Justin Alfond.

In 1980, Rand and her husband Dale opened Dale Rand Printing on Washington Avenue at the base of Munjoy Hill.
