= Portland Railroad Company Substation =

- U.S. National Register of Historic Places
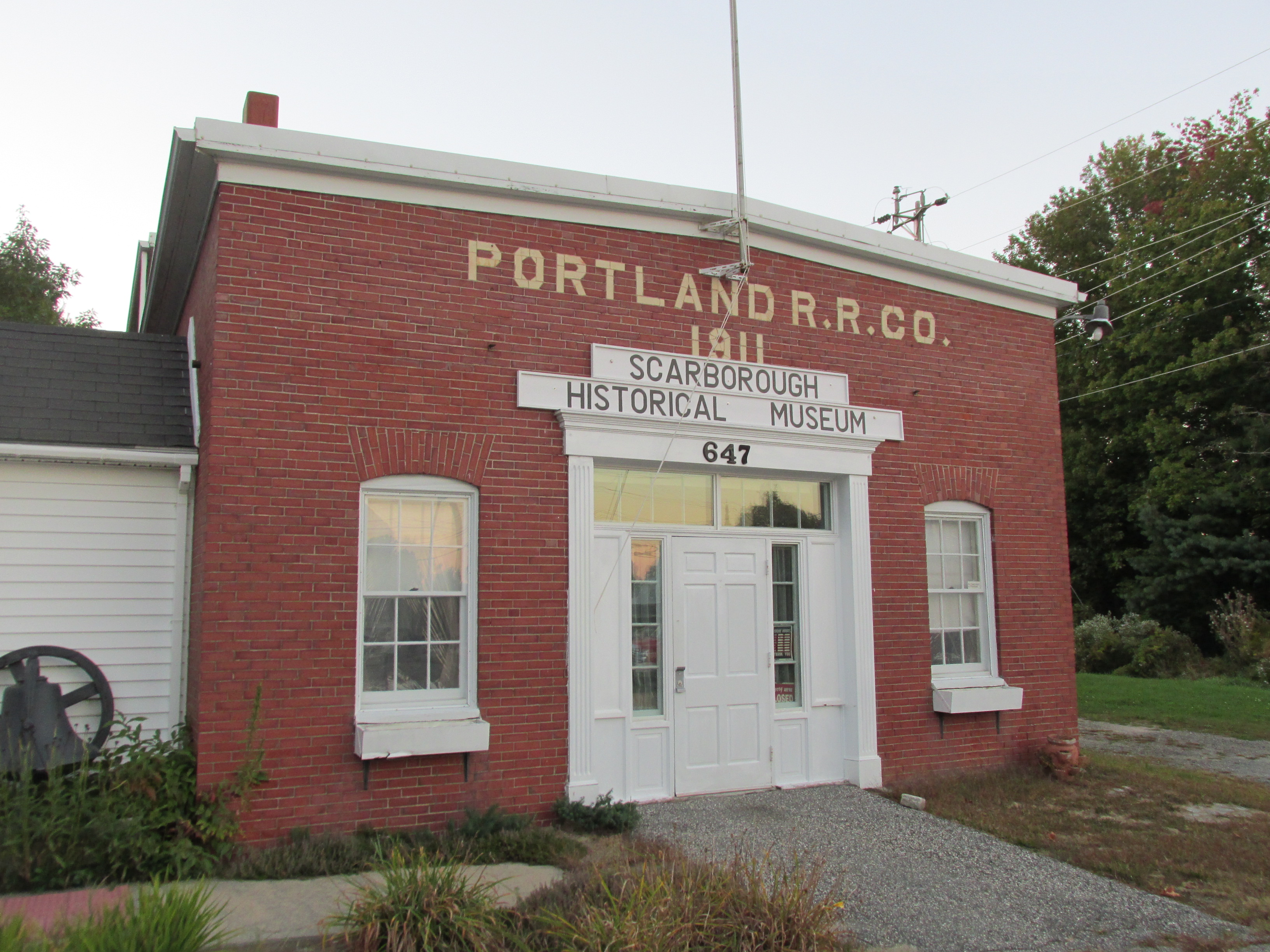
- Portland Railroad Company Substation

- Location within Maine Location within the United States
- Location: 649 US 1, Scarborough, Maine
- Coordinates: 43°34′6″N 70°23′31″W
- Area: less than one acre
- Built: 1911
- NRHP reference No.: 91000320
- Added to NRHP: March 22, 1991

The Portland Railroad Company Substation, now the Scarborough Historical Museum, is a former power substation of the Portland Railroad Company, a trolley service provider, at 649 United States Route 1 in Scarborough, Maine. The station was built in 1911, and is one of the few trolley-related facilities surviving in the state. The building was listed on the National Register of Historic Places on March 22, 1991.

== Description and history ==
The former Portland Railroad Company Substation is located in southwestern Scarborough (the area known as Dunstan Corner), on the north side of US 1, at the back of a parking lot separating the Scarborough Fire Station and Alger Hall, the local Masonic lodge. The building consists of a single-story front section, and a taller, yet also single-story, rear section. Both parts are built out of brick, and have shallow-pitch gabled roofs. The front facade is three bays wide, with sash windows in segmented-arch openings flanking a larger central bay. That bay originally housed a large equipment entrance with tall double doors, but has been infilled with a pedestrian entrance flanked by sidelights and paneling, and topped by a broad transom window. Original pedestrian entrances (some now closed off) were located on the southwest and northeast sides of the front block, and also in the larger rear section. The interior of the building has no original equipment related to its use as an electrical power substation, and now houses exhibits of the Scarborough Historical Society.

The building was erected in 1911 as a power substation for the Saco Division of the Portland Railroad Company, a trolley operator in southern Maine. It is the best preserved building from the state's period when it had an extensive light rail network, most of the others having been either demolished or substantially altered for other purposes.

== See also ==
- National Register of Historic Places listings in Cumberland County, Maine
