= Fort Allen Park =

Public park in Portland, Maine

- Interactive map of Fort Allen Park
- Type: Urban park
- Location: Portland, Maine, United States
- Coordinates: 43.66536°N 70.24057°W
- Owner: City of Portland
- Open: 24 hours

Fort Allen Park is an urban park in the Munjoy Hill neighborhood of Portland, Maine, United States. It covers 9 acres (3.6 ha) and abuts the Eastern Promenade to the south. It was built in the 1890s, designed by the city's chief engineer William Goodwin and backed by mayor James P. Baxter, according to a plaque in the park. Fort Allen was probably originally built in 1775, may have served as part of Fort Sumner, and was rebuilt by the city and used to guard Portland during the War of 1812 due to its high vantage point overlooking Casco Bay. The park is home to a 6-inch gun from the USS Maine (the ship whose explosion in Havana, Cuba started the Spanish–American War), the foremast and bridge structure of the World War II cruiser USS Portland (CA-33), two Civil War-era 4.5-inch siege rifles, an American Civil War memorial bench erected in 1929, and an historic bandstand which was built in the 1890s. In 2012, a local non-profit group, Friends of the Eastern Promenade, sought to restore Fort Allen Park to its original look. As of 2016 this has resulted in additional interpretive plaques throughout the park, along with other improvements.

Some sources state that Fort Allen dates from 1775 and was originally named for Revolutionary War hero Ethan Allen. It was initially a half-moon battery mounting five guns. After 1794 it may have served as the "detached battery" of nearby Fort Sumner, as described in the Secretary of War's report for 1811. Fort Allen was rebuilt in 1814 with city resources, adding a magazine and barracks due to the British capture of Eastport and Castine in the War of 1812. A plaque at the park states that at this time it was named for Master Commandant William Henry Allen, a naval officer mortally wounded in the War of 1812.

== Gallery ==
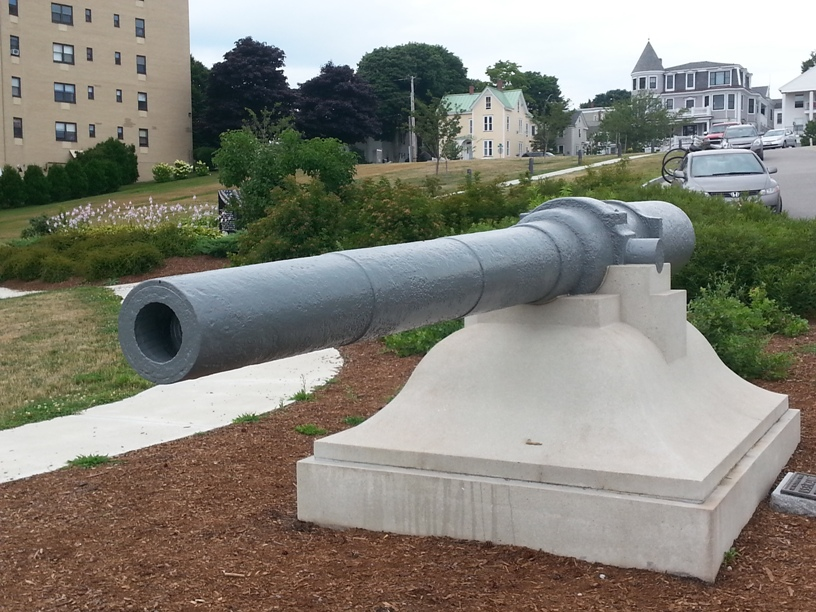
6"/30 caliber gun salvaged from USS Maine in Fort Allen Park

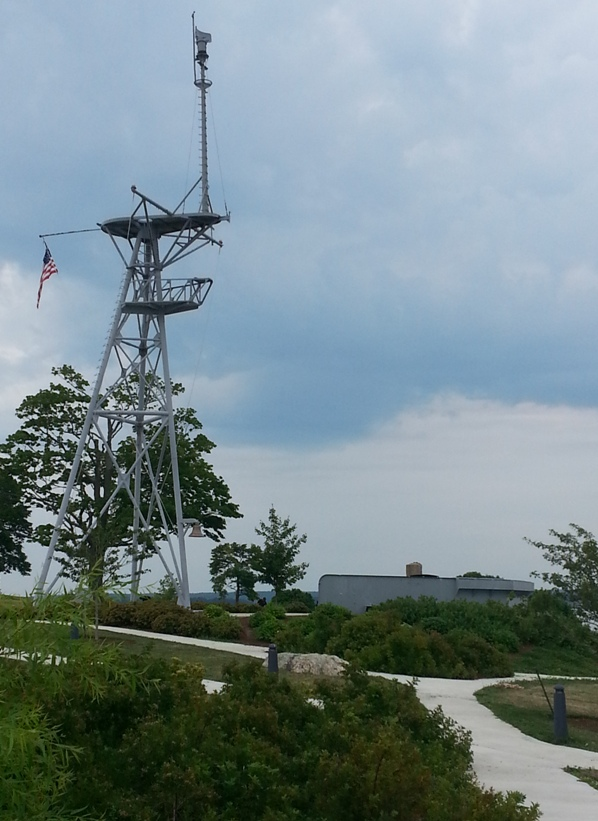
Mainmast and bridge shield of USS Portland (CA-33)

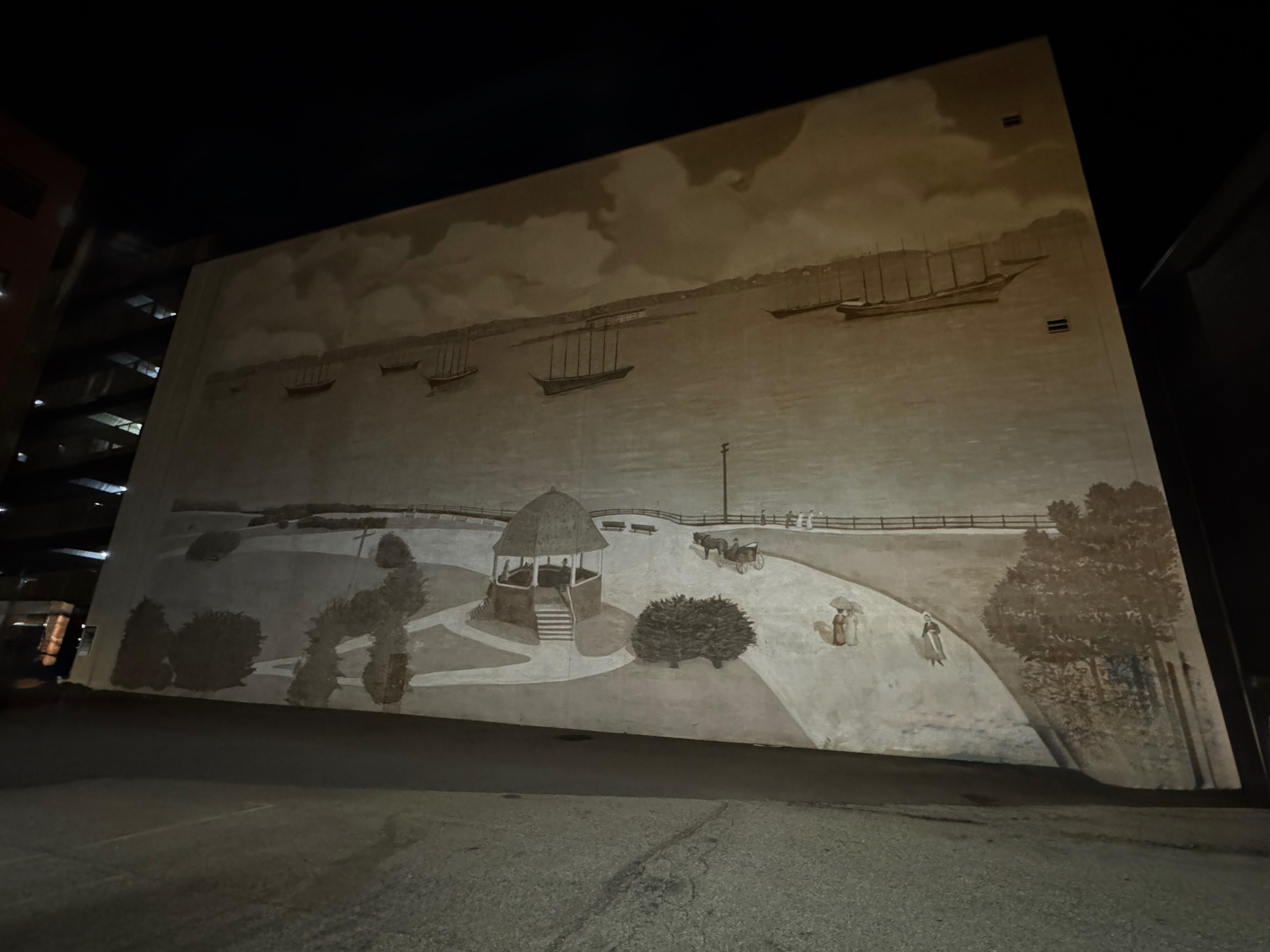
A mural of Fort Allen Park on a building on Portland's Middle Street

== See also ==
- Portland Railroad Company
