= J. Elizabeth Mitchell =

American politician (born 1969)

Member of the Maine House of Representatives from District 30
- Preceded by: Anne Rand
- Succeeded by: Benjamin F. Dudley
- In office December 1994 – December 1998

Personal details
- Born: June 29, 1969 (age 57) New Haven, Connecticut
- Party: Democratic
- Education: Reed College
- Profession: Health Advocate

J. Elizabeth Mitchell (born June 29, 1969) is an American politician and health advocate from Maine. Since 2013, Mitchell has been the CEO of the Network for Regional Healthcare Improvement. A Democrat, Mitchell served two terms (1994-1998) in the Maine House of Representatives representing the Munjoy Hill neighborhood of Portland, Maine.

In 1994, Mitchell, at the age of 25, ran uncontested in both the Maine Democratic Party primary and the November general election for District 30. She replaced Anne Rand, who won a seat in the Maine Senate.

In March 2013, Mitchell was hired as the CEO of the Network for Regional Healthcare Improvement. She had previously directed the Maine Health Management Coalition since its foundation in 2008.

== Personal ==
Mitchel was born on June 29, 1969, in New Haven, Connecticut. She earned a B.A. in religion from Reed College in 1991.
