= Benjamin F. Dudley =

American politician

Member of the Maine House of Representatives from Munjoy Hill
- Preceded by: J. Elizabeth Mitchell
- Succeeded by: Anne Rand
- In office December 1998 – December 2006

Personal details
- Born: October 19, 1969 (age 56) Portland, Maine
- Party: Democratic
- Education: University of Southern Maine
- Profession: Health Advocate

Benjamin F. Dudley (born October 19, 1969) is an American politician from Maine. Dudley, a Democrat, represented the Munjoy Hill neighborhood of Portland, Maine in the Maine House of Representatives from 1998 to 2006.

Dudley graduated from the University of Southern Maine in 1999.

Dudley was Chellie Pingree's political director during the 2002 U.S. Senate election. Pingree lost to incumbent Susan Collins with 41% of the vote.
