= Aaron Libby =

American politician

Aaron F. Libby

Member of the Maine House of Representatives from the 139th district
- In office December 2010 – December 2014
- Preceded by: Joseph Wagner
- Succeeded by: Dwayne W. Prescott

Personal details
- Born: April 4, 1983 (age 43) Sanford, Maine
- Party: Republican
- Spouse(s): Allison Rose Libby (2012–present)
- Occupation: Farmer
- Website: Campaign website

Aaron F. Libby (born April 4, 1983) is an American politician from Maine. Libby, a Republican from Waterboro, Maine, served in the Maine House of Representatives from December 2010 to December 2014. Libby's district comprised Waterboro and parts of Lyman. In April 2014, Libby announced that he would not seek re-election.

== Election ==
Libby first ran in 2010 as a Republican, defeating Democratic incumbent Joseph Wagner in District 139. He ran successfully for a second term in 2012, again defeating Wagner. He was endorsed by Ron Paul, Susan Collins, Defense of Liberty PAC, the Maine Republican Liberty Caucus, and Liberty Candidates.

== Political positions ==
Libby is known for his libertarian views.

== Tenure ==
As a freshman in the 125th Legislature, Libby was appointed to the Energy, Utilities and Technology Committee. Libby has introduced bills to nullify the Patient Protection and Affordable Care Act, eliminate a state sales tax on U.S. gold and silver coinage, prohibit enforcement of the National Defense Authorization Act, eliminate federal regulation of commerce within the state of Maine, and regulate pat-downs by state employees and contractors such as the Transportation Security Administration.

Libby proposed a "permitless carry" bill that would abolish the requirement in Maine law for a permit to carry concealed handguns. In 2013, the legislation was defeated in the Maine House of Representatives by a vote of 74 to 73.

Libby supported endorsed Ron Paul's campaign in the 2012 Republican primaries, along with ten other Maine state representatives. Libby was elected and served as a delegate supporting Paul at the 2012 Republican National Convention in Tampa, Florida.

In 2013, Libby co-sponsored a bill with Democratic Rep. Diane Russell to legalize the recreational use of marijuana in Maine.

== Personal life ==
Libby was born on April 4, 1983, in Sanford, Maine. He attended Massabesic High School, graduating in 2002. In 2012, Libby married Allison McGinley, who had attended Massabesic one year behind Libby. The couple reside in Waterboro, and own and operate Libby & Son U-Picks, a pick-your-own fruit farm in Limerick. Libby sits on the Executive Committee of the Maine State Pomological Society.
