= George Munjoy =

- Born: c. 1626
- Died: 1680
- Spouse: Mary Phillips

George Munjoy (c. 1626–1680) was an early settler in what was Falmouth, Province of Maine. Munjoy Hill, in today's Portland, Maine, is named for him, as was Peaks Island for a period.

== Personal life ==
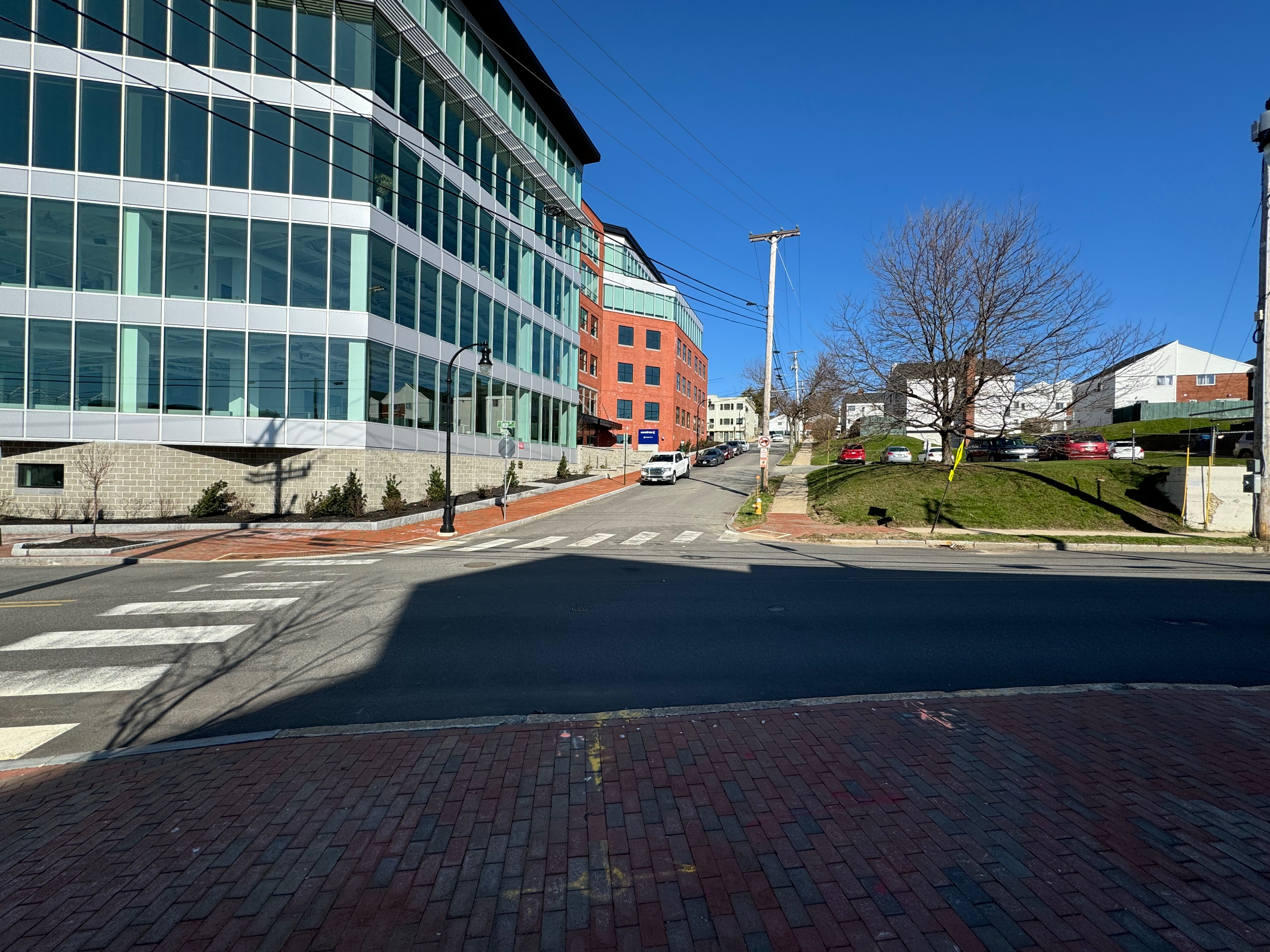
The foot of Mountfort Street, at Fore Street, where Munjoy lived

Munjoy was born around 1626. He moved north, from the Massachusetts Bay Colony, in 1659, and settled the land on the eastern end of the peninsula of Falmouth, Province of Maine. His father-in-law had purchased the land from George Cleeve, one of the founders of the city which is known today as Portland. Munjoy lived, in a fortified house known as Munjoy's Garrison, near the corner of Mountfort Street and Fore Street. The nearby Eastern Cemetery was established nine years after his arrival.

Munjoy was married to Mary Phillips, daughter of Boston Merchant John Phillips. They had a daughter, Mary, who married John Palmer. Peaks Island was named for both Munjoy and Palmer for different periods.

== Death ==
Munjoy died in 1680, aged around 54.
