= George Bramhall =

- Born: 1637
- Died: September 21, 1689 (aged 51–52); Deering Oaks Park, Casco, Province of Maine

George Bramhall (1637 – September 21, 1689) was a 17th-century English emigrant to the New England Colonies. Bramhall Hill and Bramhall Street, in Portland, Maine, are now named for him.

== Early life ==
Bramhall emigrated from England to the Plymouth Colony in 1665. He moved north to Dover, Province of New Hampshire, in 1670, then again to Casco (today's Portland), Province of Maine, in 1678. After settling beside Casco Bay, he purchased a 400-acre (160 ha) farm, from George Cleeve, on what is today called Bramhall Hill, in Portland's West End neighborhood.

== Career ==
Bramhall was a tanner by profession and set up a tannery in the Western Promenade area of Portland.

== Personal life ==
He married Martha Beard in 1670. They had one known child, Joshua (1683–1763).

== Death ==
Bramhall was killed in 1689, after a conflict with Native Americans during the early stages of King William's War. The fight took place where Deering Oaks Park stands today. A monument commemorates the event.
