= Diane Russell =

American politician (born 1976)

Member of the Maine House of Representatives for the 120th District
- In office December 3, 2008 – December 2016
- Preceded by: Anne Rand
- Succeeded by: Michael Sylvester

Personal details
- Born: August 9, 1976 (age 50) Bryant Pond, Maine, U.S.
- Party: Democratic
- Education: University of Southern Maine
- Profession: Public relations consultant

Diane Marie Russell (born August 9, 1976; formerly Russell-Natera) is an American politician who served in the Maine House of Representatives. She is a member of the Democratic Party.

== Political career ==
When Russell first ran for the State House in 2008, she was working as a cashier at a local convenience store. She served on the Veterans and Legal Affairs Committee and the Energy, Utilities and Technology Committee.

In 2011, The Nation magazine named her "Most Valuable State Representative" on its annual Progressive Honor Roll.

In 2011, Russell introduced a bill to legalize marijuana in Maine. The bill, LD 1453, was voted down in committee (3-8) in March and down by the House of Representatives in June. After being re-elected in 2012, Russell introduced a similar bill to legalize marijuana in 2013. It was co-sponsored by Republican Rep. Aaron Libby.

In November 2012, Russell unsuccessfully sought the Speaker of the Maine House of Representatives position, losing in a Democratic Party caucus vote to Mark Eves of York County.

In 2016, Russell, who was barred by Maine's term limits law from running again for a House seat, ran for a seat in the Maine Senate, and lost in the Democratic primary election, coming in third among the three candidates.

On August 10, 2017, Russell announced her campaign for Governor of Maine in the 2018 race. She finished sixth of seven candidates in the primary with 2.2%.

== Personal life ==
Russell is a native of Woodstock, Maine, and is a graduate of Leavitt Area High School. She received a B.A. in media studies from the University of Southern Maine. She has also worked as a public relations consultant.

== Electoral history ==
2008 Maine House of Representatives Democratic primary, District 120
Party	Candidate	Votes	%
Democratic	Diane Marie Russell-Natera	566	63.9
Democratic	Edward J. Democracy	320	36.1

2008 Maine House of Representatives election, District 120
Party	Candidate	Votes	%
Democratic	Diane Marie Russell-Natera	2,104	51.6
Green	Sandy L. Amborn	1,231	30.2
Republican	Peter L. Doyle	741	18.2

2010 Maine House of Representatives election, District 120
Party	Candidate	Votes	%
Democratic	Diane Marie Russell	1,690	53.2
Green	Anna Trevorrow	945	29.7
Republican	Thomas T. Elliman	413	13.0

2012 Maine House of Representatives election, District 120
Party	Candidate	Votes	%
Democratic	Diane Marie Russell	3,008	64.4
Republican	Davian Jon Akers	658	14.1
Green	Justine A. Lynn	619	13.3

2014 Maine House of Representatives election, District 39
Party	Candidate	Votes	%
Democratic	Diane Marie Russell	2,701	63.2
Green	Lauren Marie Besanko	1,020	23.9
Blank votes	N/A	547	12.8

2016 Maine Senate Democratic primary, District 27
Party	Candidate	Votes	%
Democratic	Ben Chipman	1,778	52.5
Democratic	Charles Radis	797	23.5
Democratic	Diane Marie Russell	770	22.7

2018 Maine gubernatorial Democratic primary
Party	Candidate	Maximum round	Maximum votes	Share in maximum round	Maximum votes First round votes Transfer votes
Democratic	Janet Mills	4	63,384	54.1%	
Democratic	Adam Cote	4	53,866	45.9%	
Democratic	Betsy Sweet	3	29,944	24.4%	
Democratic	Mark Eves	2	19,521	15.7%	
Democratic	Mark Dion	1	5,200	4.1%	
Democratic	Diane Russell	1	2,728	2.2%	
Democratic	Donna Dion	1	1,596	1.3%	
