= Michael Sylvester (politician) =

American politician

Michael A. Sylvester

Member of the Maine House of Representatives from the 39th district
- In office 2016–2022
- Preceded by: Diane Russell

Personal details
- Party: Democratic
- Education: Bard College (BA)

Michael A. “Mike” Sylvester is an American politician who has served as a member of the Maine House of Representatives since 2016. He represents the 39th House District as a member of the Democratic Party. Sylvester is a member of Democratic Socialists of America.

== Early life and education ==
Raised in Lewiston, Maine, Sylvester attended Bard College, graduating with a degree in English.

== Career ==
After college, he worked as a union organizer for twenty years, starting off by organizing nursing homes in West Virginia. After returning to Maine, he started a business renting out golf carts on Peaks Island, where he lives. He served for three years on the Peaks Island Council, including two years as chair.

In 2016, Sylvester ran to succeed the term-limited state representative for the 39th District, Diane Russell, defeating lawyer Andrew Edwards in the Democratic primary and Republican Peter Doyle in the general election. Sylvester ran as an open democratic socialist, supporting an increase in the minimum wage, legalization of marijuana, and single-payer health care. In 2018, he won a second term in a landslide. In 2018, Sylvester was appointed as the House Chair of the Joint Committee on Labor and Housing. In his role as House Chair, he helped to pass Workers Compensation Reform, a Statewide Paid Time Off Bill and a bill to legalize the rights of loggers to organize unions. Bills sponsored by Sylvester to create a municipal “union card check” law and to create a Ground Water Resource Committee were signed into law while a bill to allow teachers to bargain over preparatory periods was vetoed by Governor Janet Mills.

Sylvester sponsored bills to allow public sector workers the right to strike and to create a state-wide single payer healthcare system. Both of these bills were carried over to the 2019 emergency session.

In May 2020, as the Chair of Maine's Labor and Housing Committee, Sylvester cross-examined Maine's Department of Labor Commissioner on unemployment compensation during the COVID-19 pandemic.

== See also ==
- List of Democratic Socialists of America who have held office in the United States
- List of Bernie Sanders 2020 presidential campaign endorsements
