= Fort Sumner (Maine) =

Historic fort in Portland, Maine, USA

- Munjoy Hill, Portland, Maine
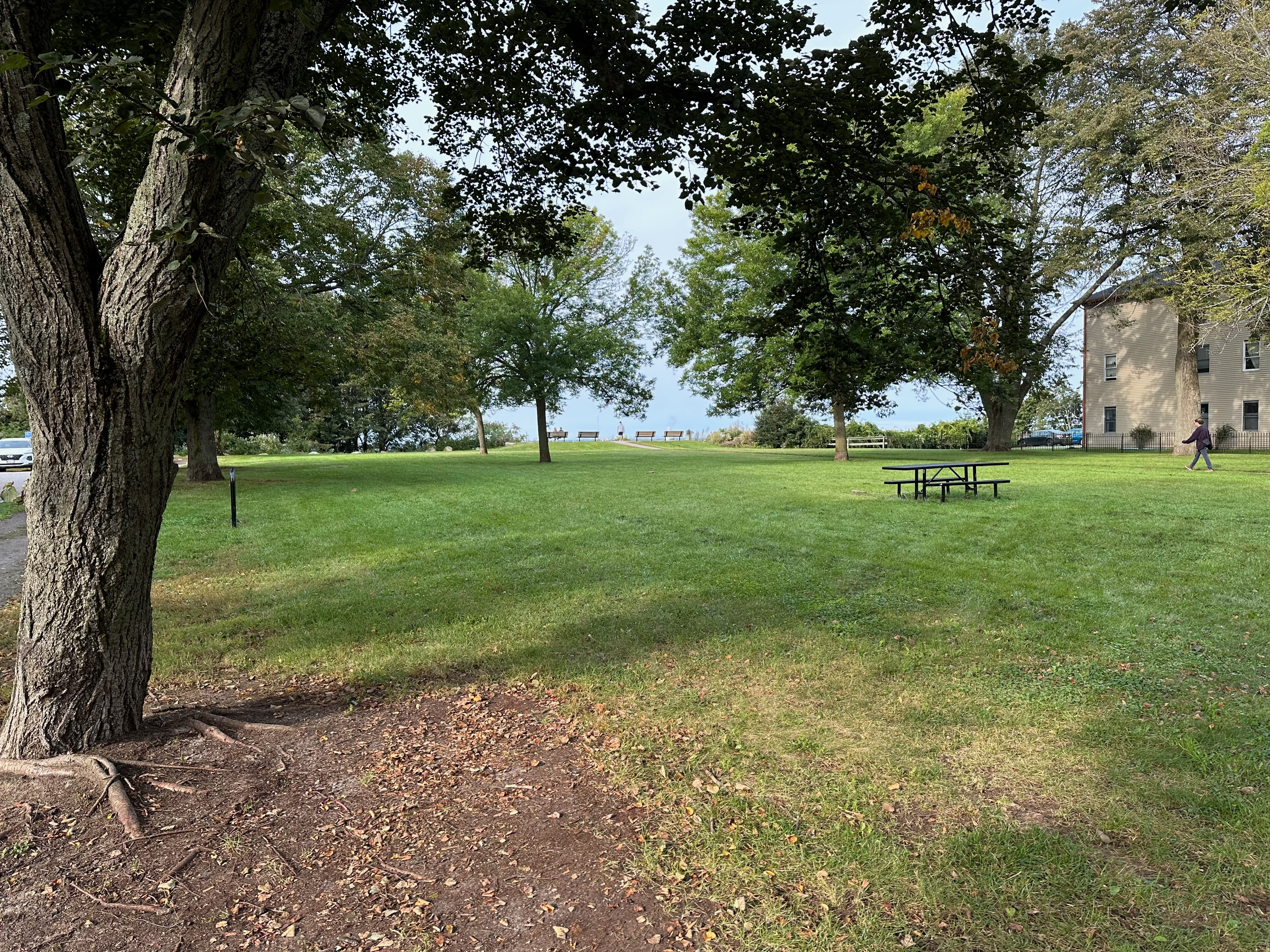
- Fort Sumner Park (2023)

Site information
- Type: Coastal Defense
- Owner: City of Portland
- Controlled by: City of Portland

Location
- Location in Maine Fort Sumner (the United States)
- Coordinates: 43°40′03″N 70°15′03″W

Site history
- Built: 1794
- In use: 1794-1820s
- Demolished: circa 1835?
- Battles/wars: War of 1812

Fort Sumner was a coastal defense fortification on Munjoy Hill in Portland, Maine, United States. It was built in 1794 as part of the first system of coastal fortifications built by the United States. It was reportedly originally named Fort Allen after the nearby Revolutionary War battery that probably became part of Fort Sumner, but was renamed in 1797 after Increase Sumner, the incumbent Governor of Massachusetts, of which Maine was then a part. The location is now Fort Sumner Park (or Standpipe Park).

== History ==
Fort Sumner consisted of a blockhouse, magazine, and barracks on the summit of Munjoy Hill, a site now occupied by Fort Sumner Park, and a "water battery" (battery near a body of water) or "detached battery", probably where Fort Allen Park is now and an upgrade of the Revolutionary War Fort Allen. The battery was rebuilt in 1798 and 1808. The Secretary of War's report for December 1811 describes a battery "at the north end of the town... of five guns mounted and four 18-pounders mounted on travelling carriages". This probably refers to the detached battery, which may have been on the Fort Allen site. Fort Sumner lessened in importance with the construction of Fort Preble and Fort Scammel in 1808, part of the federal government's second system of fortifications. Fort Allen was rebuilt in 1814 with city resources, adding a magazine and barracks due to the British capture of Eastport and Castine in the War of 1812.

In 1800-1801 Fort Sumner's commander was Captain John Henry, who resigned his command in 1801, became a spy for the British, and was later instrumental in starting the War of 1812. In 1802 the fort's commander was Captain Amos Stoddard of the Regiment of Artillerists, a Portland resident, who successfully kept the fort garrisoned when ordered to Fort Constitution in Portsmouth, New Hampshire, by dividing his company. Fort Sumner was probably abandoned in the early 1820s.

In 1827 John Neal opened a Turnen gymnasium at the fort. Neal originally founded the gymnasium earlier that year at the Market House and moved it to Silver Street before finding a home at Fort Sumner. This is the earliest gymnasium established by an American.

== Present ==
Fort Sumner Park (also called Standpipe Park) offers views of the city's skyline and Back Cove. Its main feature is the Fort Sumner Steps, which cross over the summit of Munjoy Hill. Nothing remains of the fort in Fort Sumner Park, but a few earthworks remain in nearby Fort Allen Park.

== Gallery ==
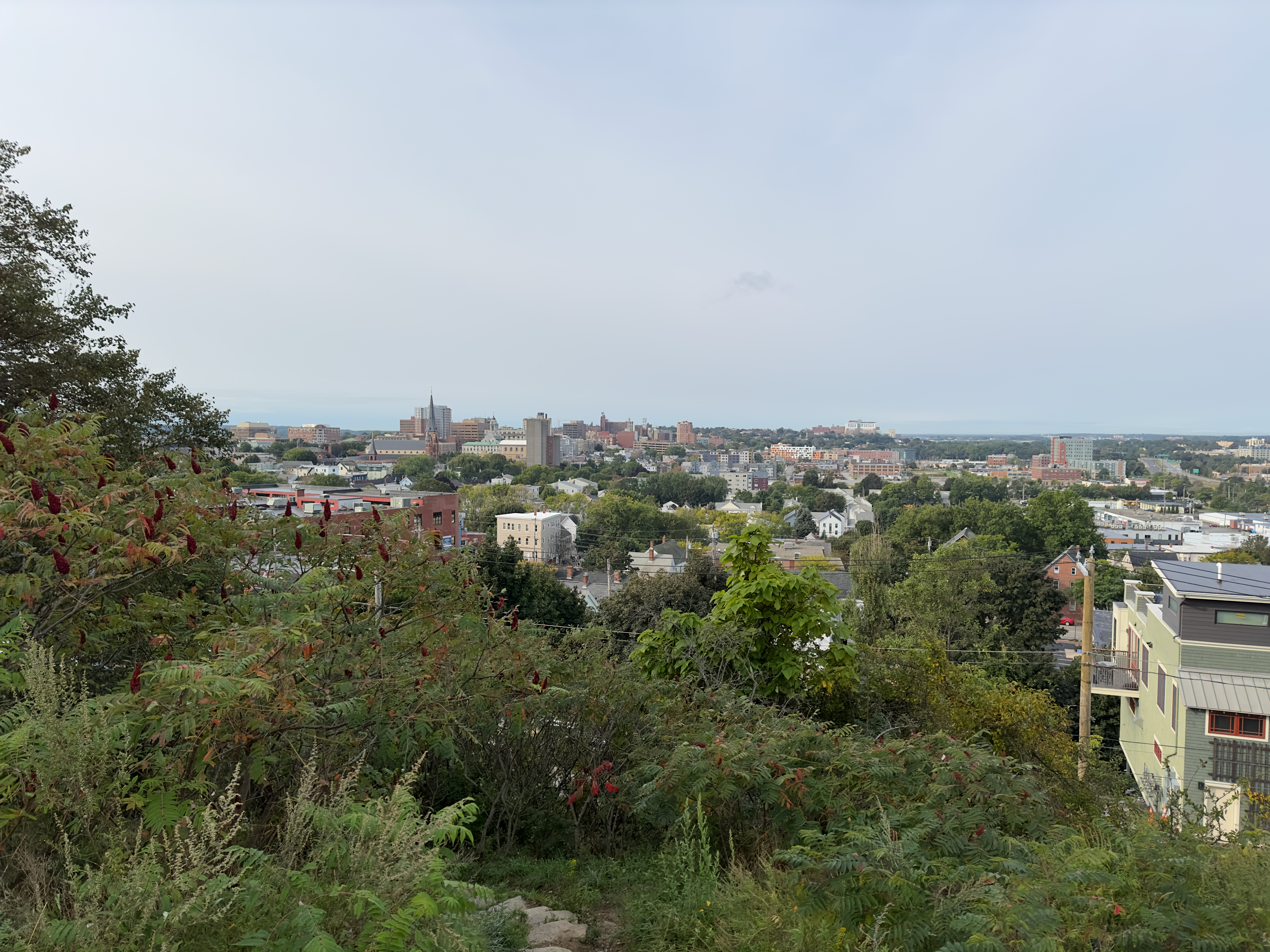

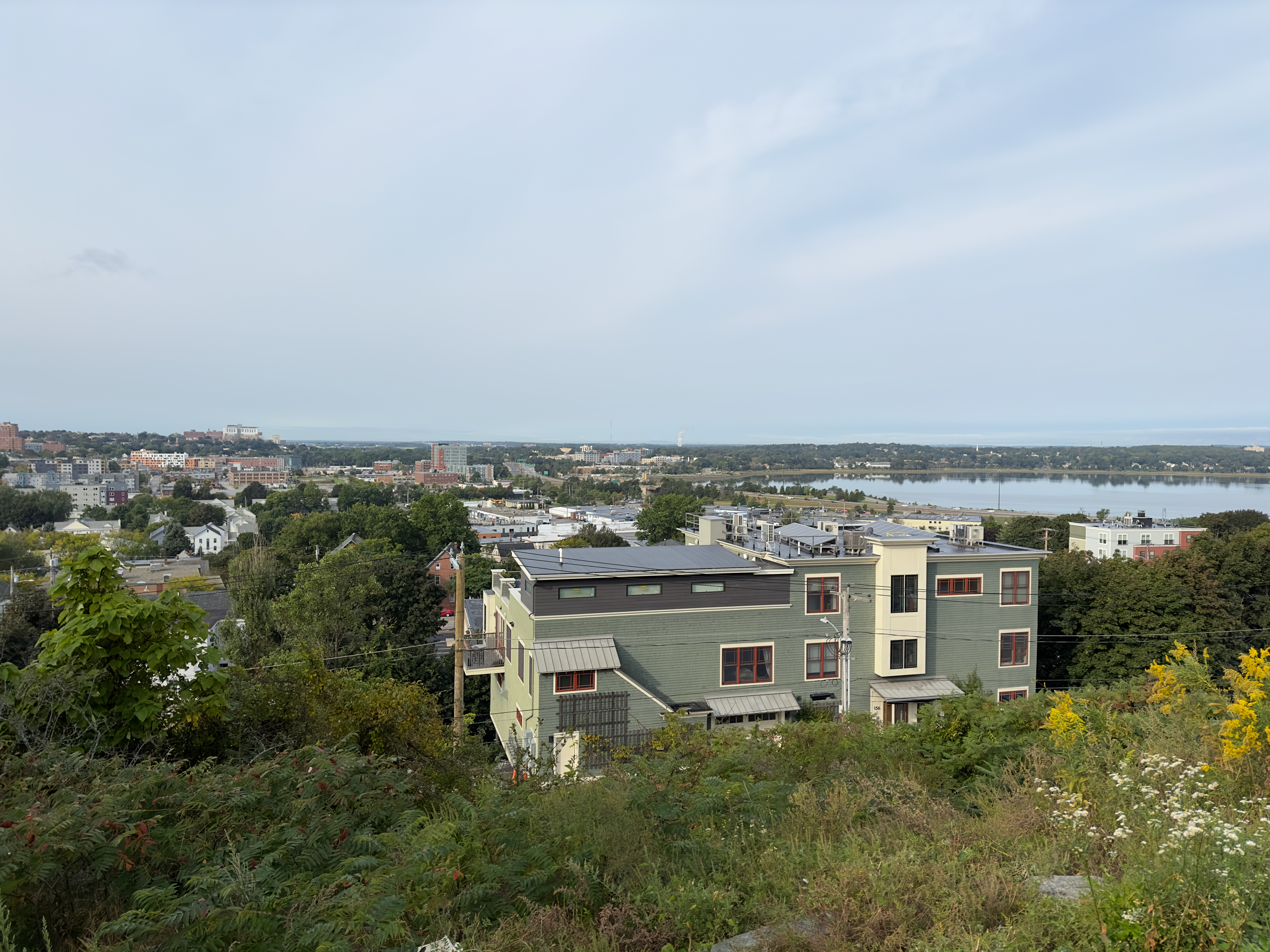

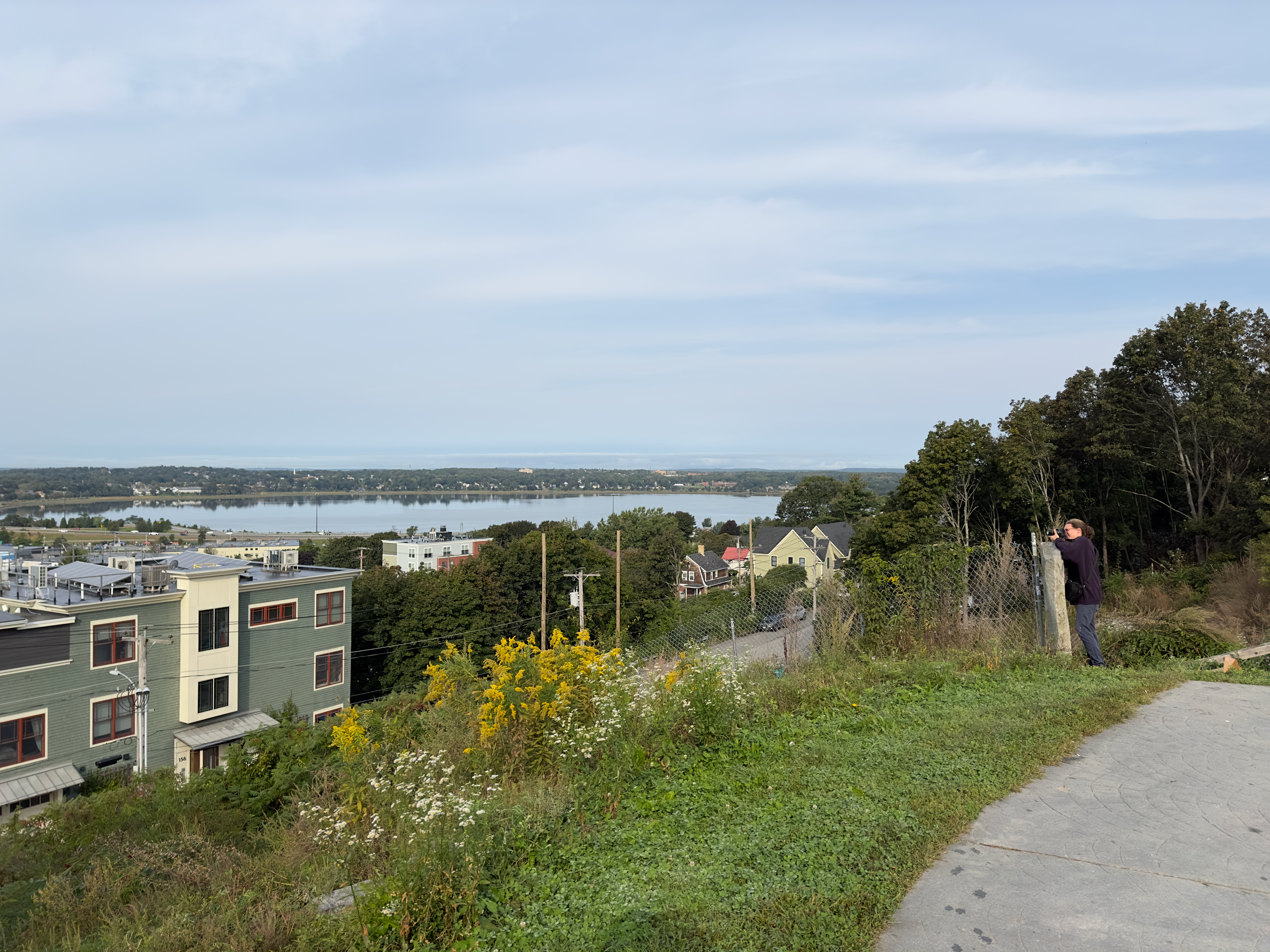

== See also ==
- Seacoast defense in the United States
- List of coastal fortifications of the United States
- Harbor Defenses of Portland
