= Portland Farmers' Market (Maine) =

Farmers market in Portland, Maine

Coordinates: 43°39′32″N 70°16′16″W

The Portland Farmers Market is a farmers' market in Portland, Maine, United States, which has been in continuous operation since 1768. Since 1990, the market has been held place year-round. From May to November, it is held on Wednesdays and on Saturdays in Deering Oaks Park. From December to April, the winter market is held on Saturdays in the former Catherine McAuley High School building.

== Products ==
It is known for organic agricultural products as well as its community atmosphere, with artists selling wares and musicians playing music. Farmers only sell items they grow or make. The market features mostly vegetarian goods, with many fresh vegetables, fruits, fresh flowers, and seedlings, and some canned goods, maple syrup, honey, raw milk, eggs, and meat.

== History ==
The Portland Farmers Market began in 1768, when Portland established a public market in the Town Hall that "served 136 families on the peninsula."

In 1805, the market moved to Hay Market Square, now Monument Square. In 1917, the market moved to Federal Street, next to Lincoln Park. In 1976, the market moved across from Federal Street, and then in 1990 it moved to its current locations at Monument Square and Deering Oaks Park.

In 2012, the market began to accept food stamp benefit cards as part of a $300,000 USDA grant to local organization Cultivating Community. The grant allows food stamp recipients to get tokens to pay for purchases. It allows debit card holders to do the same.

The market was named one of the ten best farmers markets in the United States by Travel + Leisure magazine in May 2010.

== Winter market ==
The winter market began in 2009 inside a privately owned building on Free Street, across from the Cumberland County Civic Center. The Portland Press Herald reported in 2010 that "the winter market has struggled to conform with the city’s ordinances and regulations, which are much more strict than the state law governing farmers markets." The paper reported that in 2009 "the market experienced delays as the vendors scrambled to comply with the city’s inspections and fees."

In 2010, the winter market moved to the Irish Heritage Center in the West End. In 2017, it moved to the Maine Girls Academy on Stevens Avenue in Deering Center.
