= Bramhall Hill =

Hill in Portland, Maine

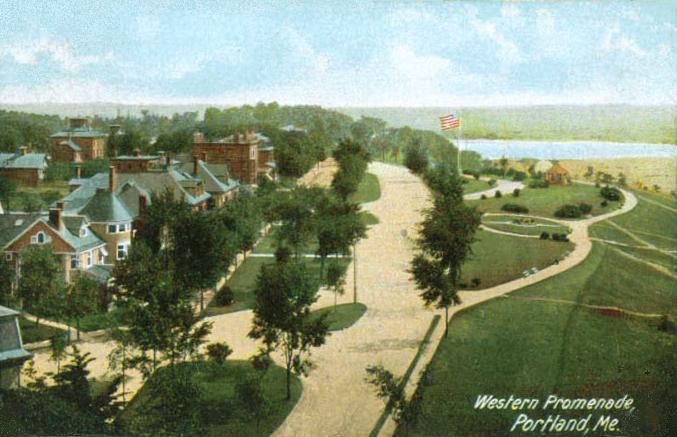
A postcard of the Western Promenade circa 1908.

Bramhall Hill is a hill in the west and southwest of the downtown peninsula of Portland, Maine. At its summit, the hill stands 171 feet (52 m) feet above sea level, with a sharp drop below. The area includes the West End neighborhood, the Western Promenade and part of the Old Port downtown district.

Bramhall Hill commands an extensive view west and north-west of the bay, the mainland and the White Mountains, around 80 miles (130 kilometres) away. The finest residence district is on Bramhall Hill. The area was originally the property of George Bramhall.

George Bramhall moved to Portland in 1680 and bought a plot of 400 acres (160 ha) of land from George Cleeve.

In 1870, a 20-inch main brought water from Sebago Lake to a 12-million-US-gallon (45,000 m^{3}) reservoir on Bramhall Hill. This supplied most of the city's drinking water.

The first capital conviction in the United States Courts after the adoption of the Constitution occurred on Bramhall Hill in 1790. Thomas Bird was convicted of piracy and murder. After a prompt refusal for pardon by President George Washington, Bird was executed.
