= Falmouth Hotel (Maine) =

Hotel in Portland, Maine

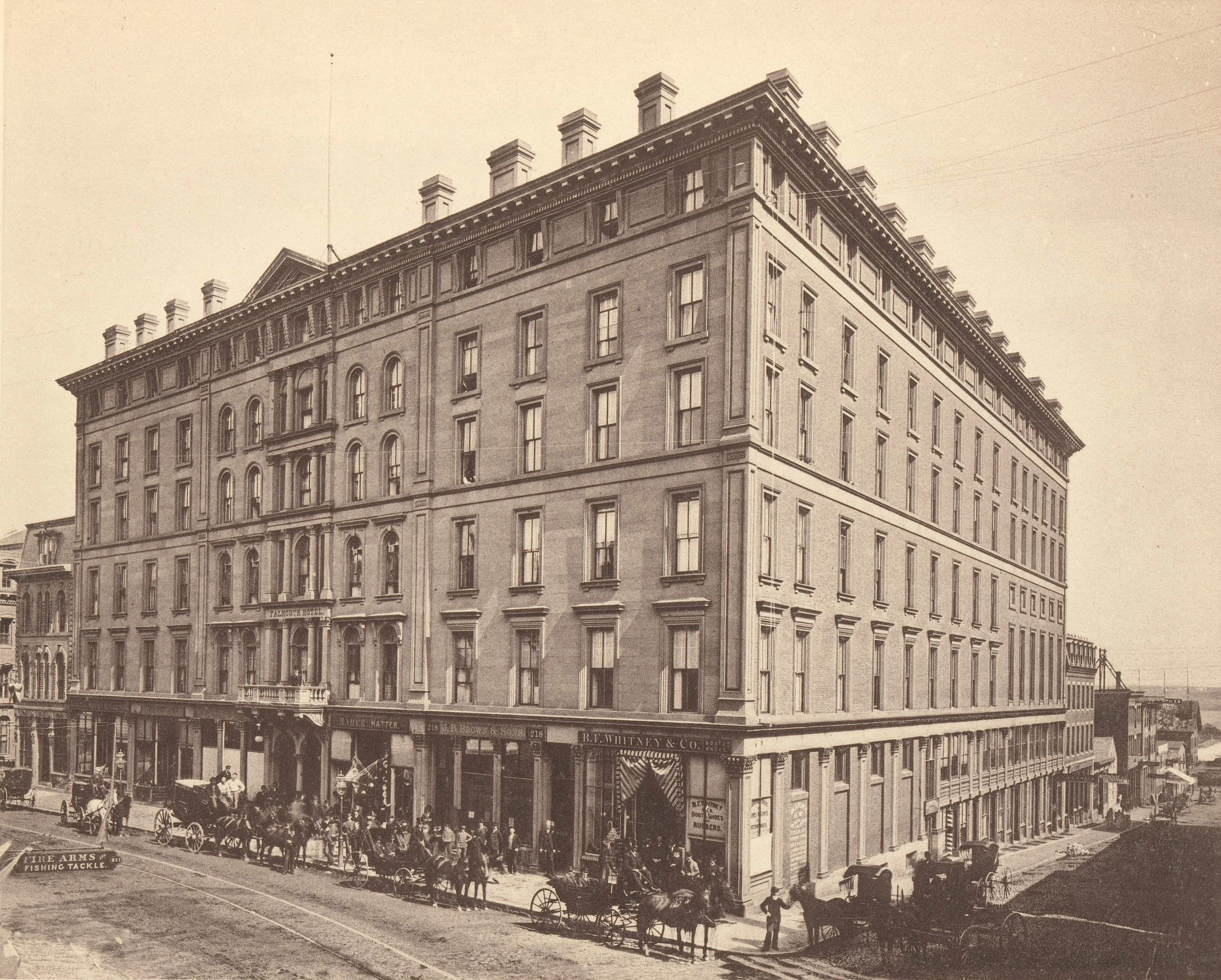
- The hotel, around 1875, looking southeast from Temple Street
- Interactive map of the Falmouth Hotel area

General information
- Status: Demolished
- Type: Hotel
- Location: Middle Street, Portland, Maine, U.S.
- Coordinates: 43.657273°N 70.254999°W
- Completed: 1868 (158 years ago)
- Closed: 1958 (68 years ago)
- Demolished: 1963 (63 years ago)
- Cost: $300,000

Technical details
- Floor count: 6

Design and construction
- Architect: Charles Alexander

Other information
- Number of rooms: 240

The Falmouth Hotel was a six-story, 240-room hotel in Portland, Maine. It stood on Middle Street, between a now-demolished Plum Street and the extant Union Street, from 1868 to 1963, when it was torn down for being a fire hazard. Presidents Ulysses S. Grant, William McKinley, Theodore Roosevelt, William Howard Taft and Warren G. Harding all stayed at the hotel, while United States Army General William Sherman visited the hotel in 1898. Due to its regular hosting of functions, the hotel became known as the "hotel of a million banquets." Plum Street connected Fore Street and Middle Street between Exchange Street and Union Street.

The hotel, which was the largest in Maine at the time of its completion, was built by John Bundy Brown, at a cost of $300,000, as a symbol of Portland's resurgence after its great fire of 1866. Designed by New York's Charles Alexander, the hotel featured a granite facade, a black walnut interior and marble fireplaces. One of its early proprietors was L. Stevens. He was followed by E. A. Gilson, formerly of the St. Nicholas Hotel in New York City, who was in the role after the hotel's first renovation, completed in 1882. Maurice, Baker & Co. pharmacists had a store on the hotel's ground floor in 1888. The ground floor also became the home of the headquarters of the Maine Automobile Association and the Maine Republican Party.

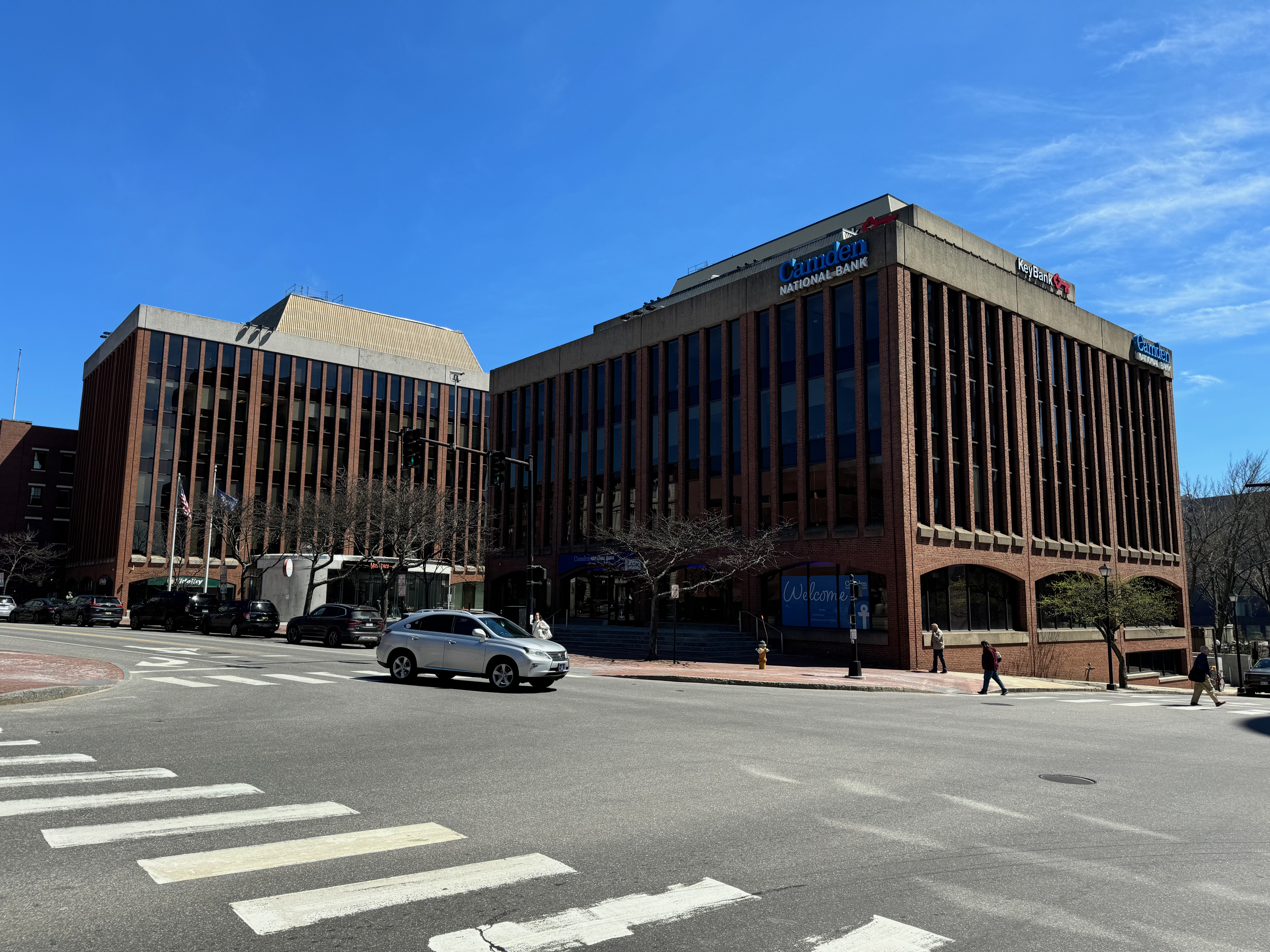
The former location of the hotel, pictured in 2024

After another renovation, it reopened as the New Falmouth Hotel in August 1898, when F. H. Nunns was its proprietor. In 1902, Nunns stated to The Hotel Monthly that the hotel was the first to use a card register. The process had a slow uptake because certain states were required by law to maintain a book of guests' names "for police or other regulation."

In the 1920s, Joseph W. Simpson was the hotel's vice-president and treasurer.

In the early 20th century, National Liberty Insurance Company of America had on office on the hotel's ground floor. Its agent was Frank R. Kugler (1877–1959). In 1913, the hotel's proprietor was J. J. Pooler, while in 1928 it was Harry Bridges.

In 1920, Carleton Glidden (1874–1924) purchased the hotel. He had been the manager of the nearby Congress Square Hotel.

By the late 1950s, the hotel's popularity had waned. It closed in early November 1958, and was purchased by the City of Portland in 1963, shortly after which it was demolished. It was replaced by today's Canal Bank Plaza in 1971.

The Tichnor Brothers printed a postcard of the hotel around 1938.

== References in popular culture ==
Christopher Hyde mentions the hotel's cocktail lounge in his 2005 book The House of Special Purpose.
