= Clay Cove =

- Cove
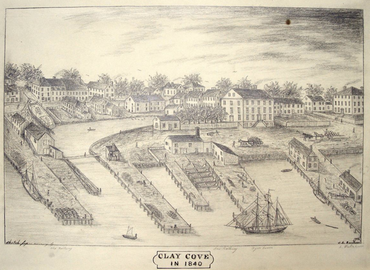
- Pictured around 1840, in a sketch by Charles Quincy Goodhue (1835–1901)
- Interactive map of Clay Cove
- Coordinates: 43.65895°N 70.24926°W
- Country: United States
- District: District of Maine
- Town: Portland

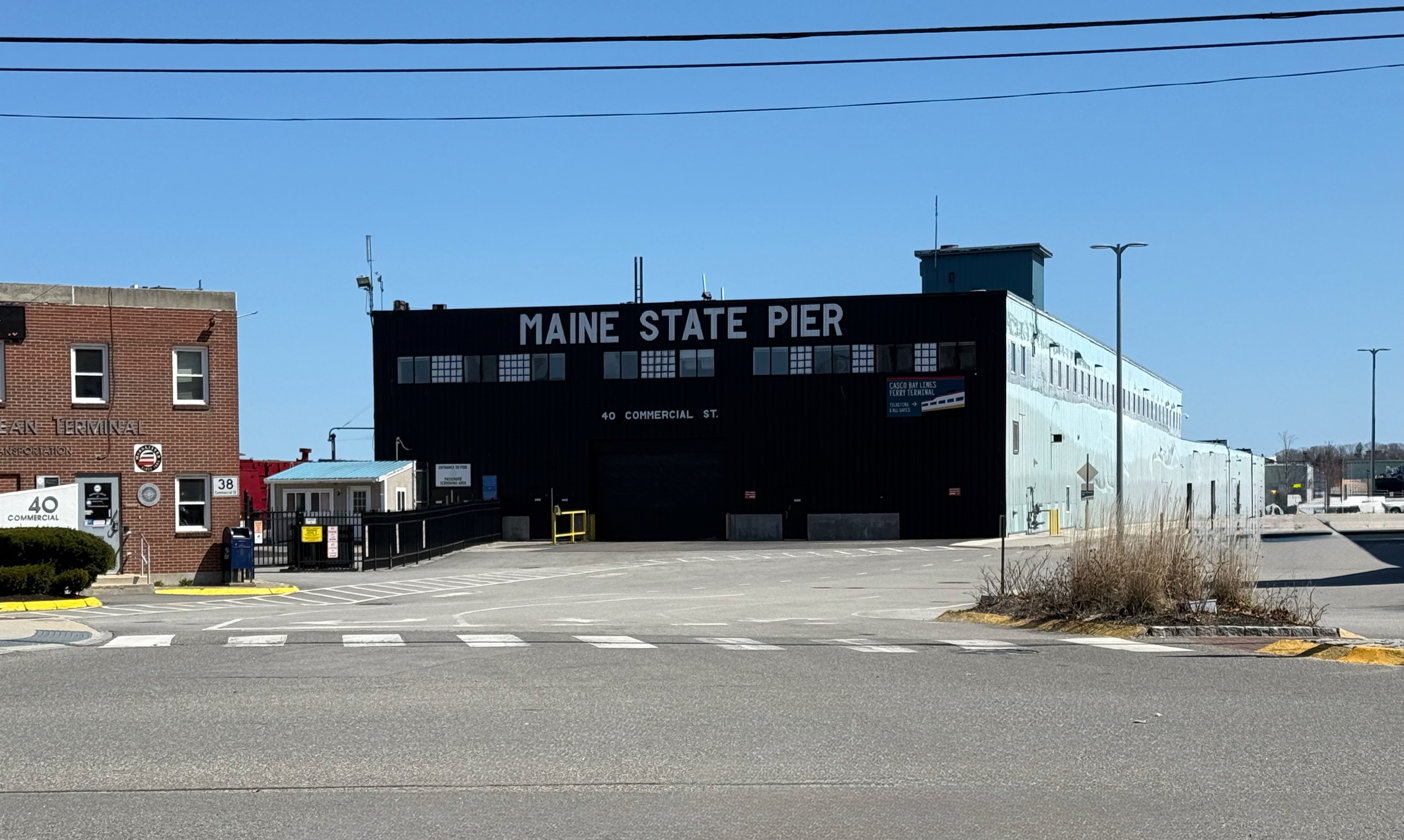
Part of Clay Cove's former location, viewed from Commercial Street in 2025

Clay Cove was a cove in Portland, District of Maine, United States. Located between the eastern ends of India Street and Franklin Street, it was the home of early shipyards, such as that of Nathaniel Dyer, Lemuel Dyer and Deacon Samuel Cobb.

Fore Street, the former waterfront of the Old Port, was laid out in 1724 to the foot of Exchange Street on the west side of Clay Cove. The cove caused Fore Street to curve away from the Fore River between India Street and Pearl Street, to which Fore Street was not connected until 1765. Fort Loyal, the town's main fortification at the time, occupied a point at the corner of Fore Street and India Street.

Atlantic Railroad Wharf overlooked the cove, prior to the wharf's demolition in the early 20th century, when Maine State Pier was constructed. Preble's Wharf (at the foot of India Street) and Tyng's Wharf (foot of what was then Fiddle Lane; replaced by today's Franklin Street) were another two wharves of Clay Cove.

An important commercial center during its existence, the cove was filled in when commerce moved west to Commercial Street, which became the waterfront in the early 20th century after land was reclaimed from the Fore River.

Portland Marine Railway was based at Clay Cove, on India Street, in 1826. It was sold to make way for the Grand Trunk Railway Station.

A creek once flowed up from the cove to Turkey Lane (today's Newbury Street). It was large enough that ships used to sail up it past Middle Street, where an arch was built over the creek.
