= Rackleff Building =

- U.S. National Register of Historic Places
- U.S. Historic district – Contributing property
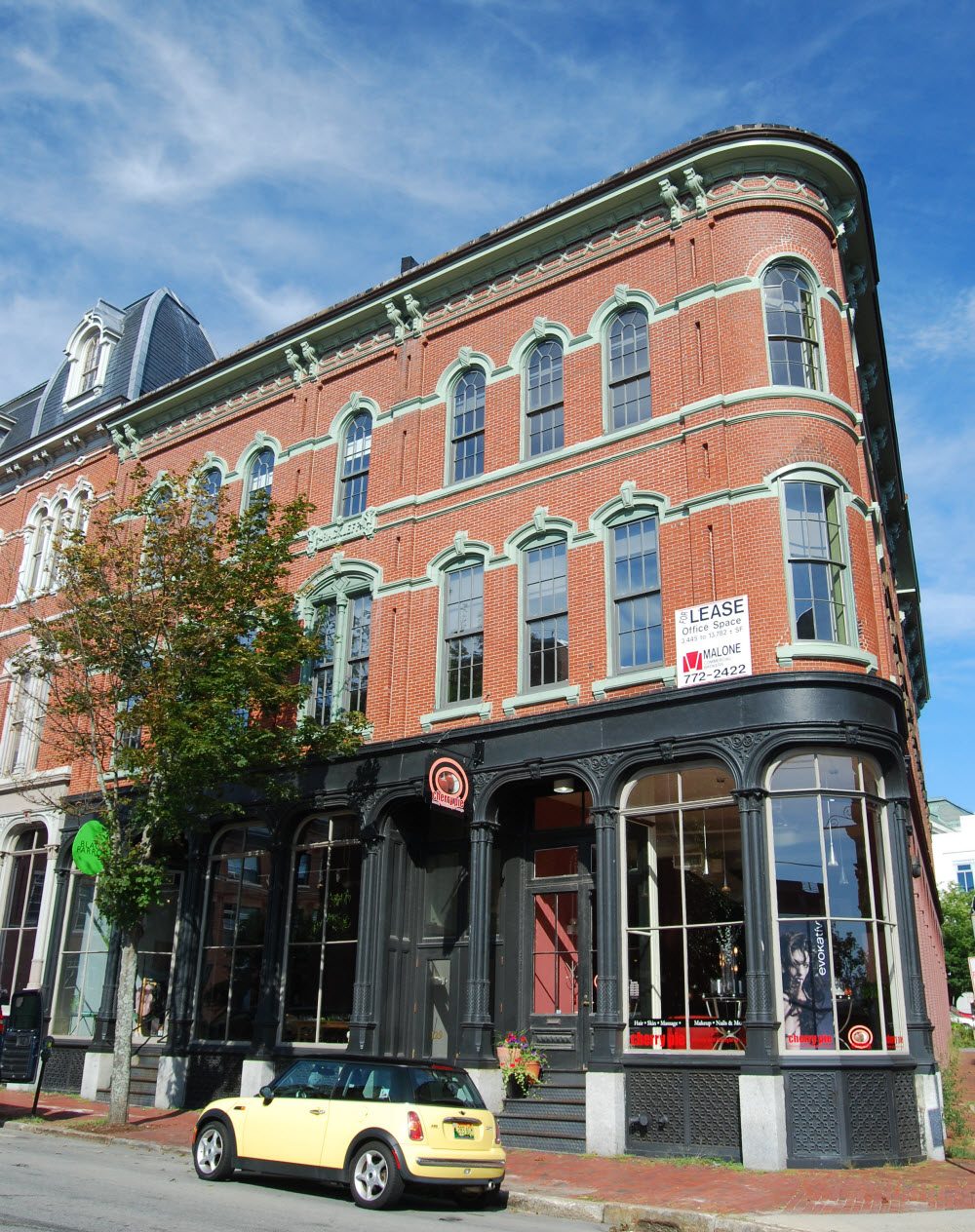
- Pictured in 2009

- Location within Maine Location within the United States
- Location: 129–131 Middle Street, Portland, Maine
- Coordinates: 43°39′31″N 70°15′14″W
- Area: less than one acre
- Built: 1867
- Architect: George M. Harding
- Architectural style: Second Empire
- Part of: Portland Waterfront (ID74000353)
- NRHP reference No.: 73000123

Significant dates
- Added to NRHP: May 09, 1973
- Designated CP: May 2, 1974

The Rackleff Building is an historic commercial building at 129–131 Middle Street in the Old Port commercial district of Portland, Maine. Built in 1867, to a design by architect George M. Harding, it is, along with the adjacent Woodman Building and Thompson Block (both also Harding buildings), part of the finest concentration of mid-19th-century commercial architecture in the city. It was added to the National Register of Historic Places.

== Description and history ==
The Rackleff Building is located in Portland's Old Port area, on the north side of Middle Street, west of Franklin Street. It is flanked on the left side by the Woodman Building, and is separated on the right from the Thompson Block by Church Street, a narrow side street. The building is three stories in height and roughly a parallelogram in shape, with a rounded section at the sharply angled corner with Church Street. The ground floor has a cast iron facade that is essentially the same as that of the Woodman building, but about one foot shorter. Piers of clustered narrow round columns support arches and an entablature. Windows on the upper levels are set in segmented-arch openings, with bracketed lintels and eared hoods that are joined by a stone stringcourse. The windows in the center of the Middle Street facade are more ornately decorated, and the building has a cornice with paired brackets, and bands of freestone hexagons and quatrefoils between. The Church Street facade has similar but simpler styling.

The building was constructed in 1867, the same year the other two buildings were constructed. All were built in the wake of Portland's 1866 great fire. George M. Harding, who came to Portland in 1858, played a major role in the rebuilding of the city's commercial district after that blaze.

== See also ==
- National Register of Historic Places listings in Cumberland County, Maine
