= Woodman Building =

- U.S. National Register of Historic Places
- U.S. Historic district – Contributing property
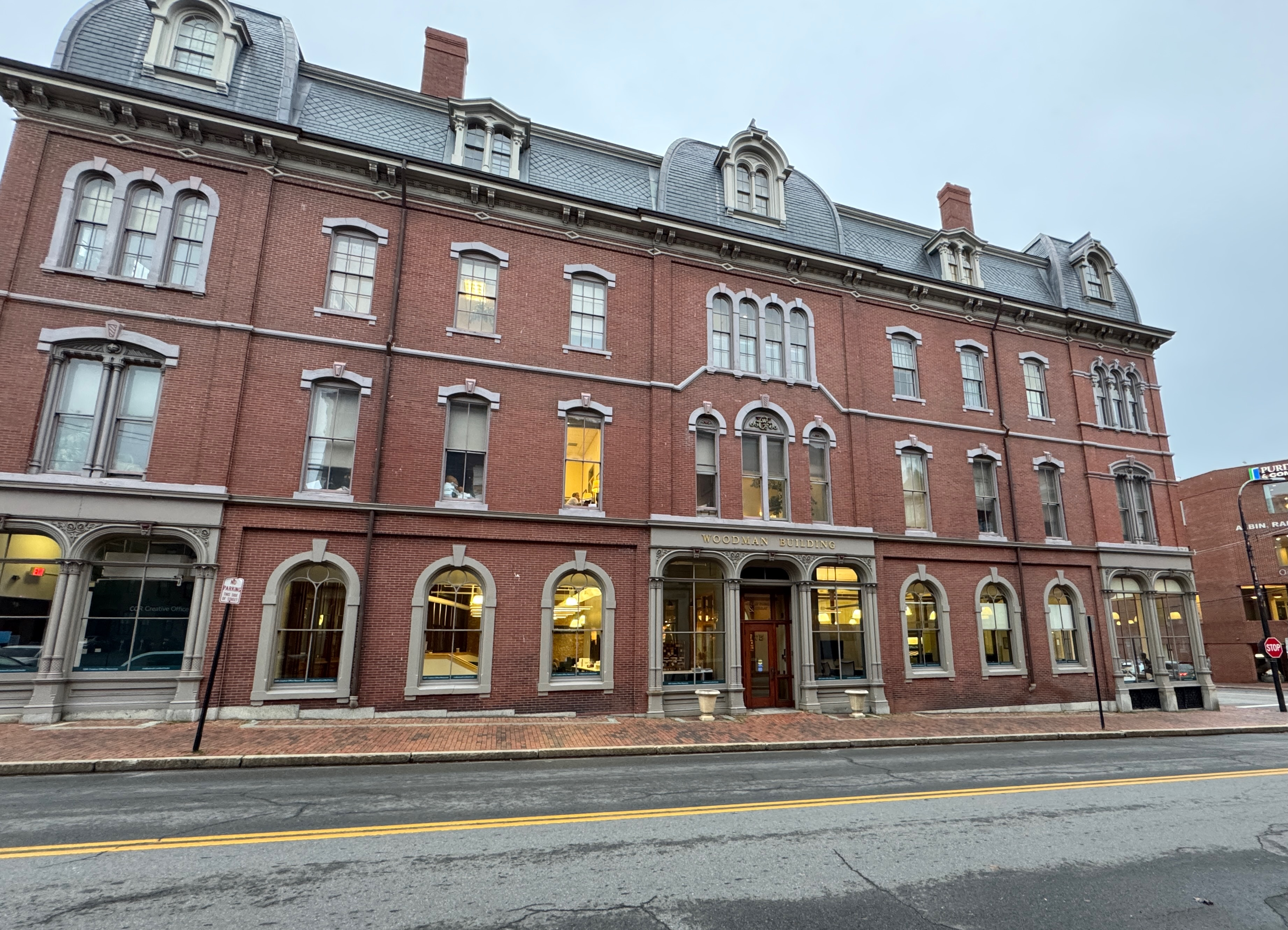
- Pearl Street elevation (2024)

- Location within Maine Location within the United States
- Location: 133-141 Middle Street, Portland, Maine
- Coordinates: 43°39′31″N 70°15′15″W
- Built: 1867
- Architect: Harding, George M.
- Architectural style: Second Empire, French Second Empire
- Part of: Portland Waterfront (ID74000353)
- NRHP reference No.: 72000075

Significant dates
- Added to NRHP: February 23, 1972
- Designated CP: May 2, 1974

The Woodman Building is a historic commercial block located at 133–141 Middle Street in Portland, Maine. It was designed by architect George M. Harding and built in 1867. It is one of the most elaborate and high-style commercial buildings built in the wake of the city's devastating 1866 fire, and is one of Maine's largest Second Empire buildings. It was listed on the National Register of Historic Places on February 23, 1972.

== Description and history ==
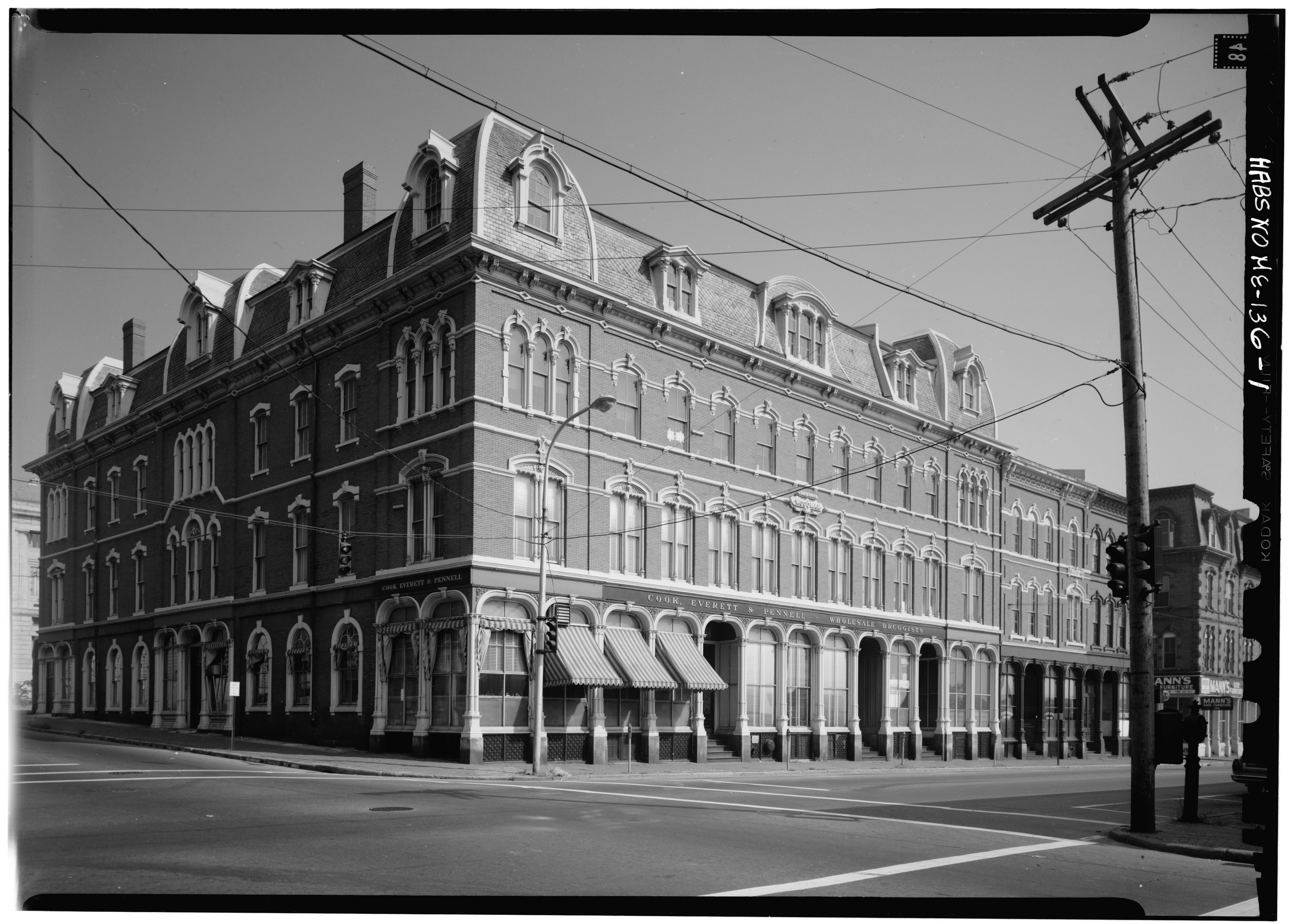
Viewed from Middle Street, c. 1933

The Rackleff Building is located in Portland's Old Port area, on the north side of Middle Street, at its corner with Pearl Street. It is flanked on the east side by the Rackleff Building. It is a four-story masonry structure, built out of brick with stone and iron trim elements. The ground floor storefronts are articulated by iron pilasters and arches, while windows on the second and third floors are combined in groups of one, two, or three, under elaborate stone arches. Stone beltcourses highlight the bottom of these arches, and also the join the sills of the windows. The building is capped by a mansard roof in the Second Empire style, with paired brackets in the eaves, corner turrets, and elaborate dormers.

The block was built in 1867 for the Woodman family after the 1866 fire devastated a large part of the city. It is one of three adjacent buildings designed by George M. Harding (the others are the Rackleff Building and the Thompson Block, further east on Middle Street), which comprise one of the city's finest blocks of period architecture. Of these, the Woodman Building is the most elaborate. The ironwork on the ground floor is a rare surviving work of a local foundry, the Portland Company.

== See also ==
- National Register of Historic Places listings in Cumberland County, Maine
