= Jordan's Meats =

American meat packing company

Jordan's Meats was an American meat-packing company based in Maine, with plants at one time in Augusta, Bangor, and Portland. Jordan's was one of the companies of Corporate Brand Foods America, purchased in 1997 by George N. Gillett Jr., then by Iowa Beef Processors (IBP) in January 2000. IBP closed the Bangor plant in September, 2001, and transferred production to the Portland plant. Tyson Foods acquired IBP in January 2000 and closed the company's remaining operations on February 1, 2005. There were 285 employees at the Portland plant and distribution center when it closed.

In 2006, Money Magazine listed Jordan's Meats as one of the biggest employers in the area, with 500 employees.

On May 6, 2010, the building formerly occupied by the company at Franklin Street and Middle Street caught fire. It was being demolished to make way for a condominium development before the fire broke out. No injuries were reported. The fire was most likely an accident, according to investigators.
