= Portland Waterfront =

Portland Waterfront may refer to:

- Tom McCall Waterfront Park in Portland, Oregon
- Old Port of Portland, Maine
