= B&M Baked Beans factory =

Historic building in Portland, Maine

Coordinates: 43.6780°N 70.2548°W

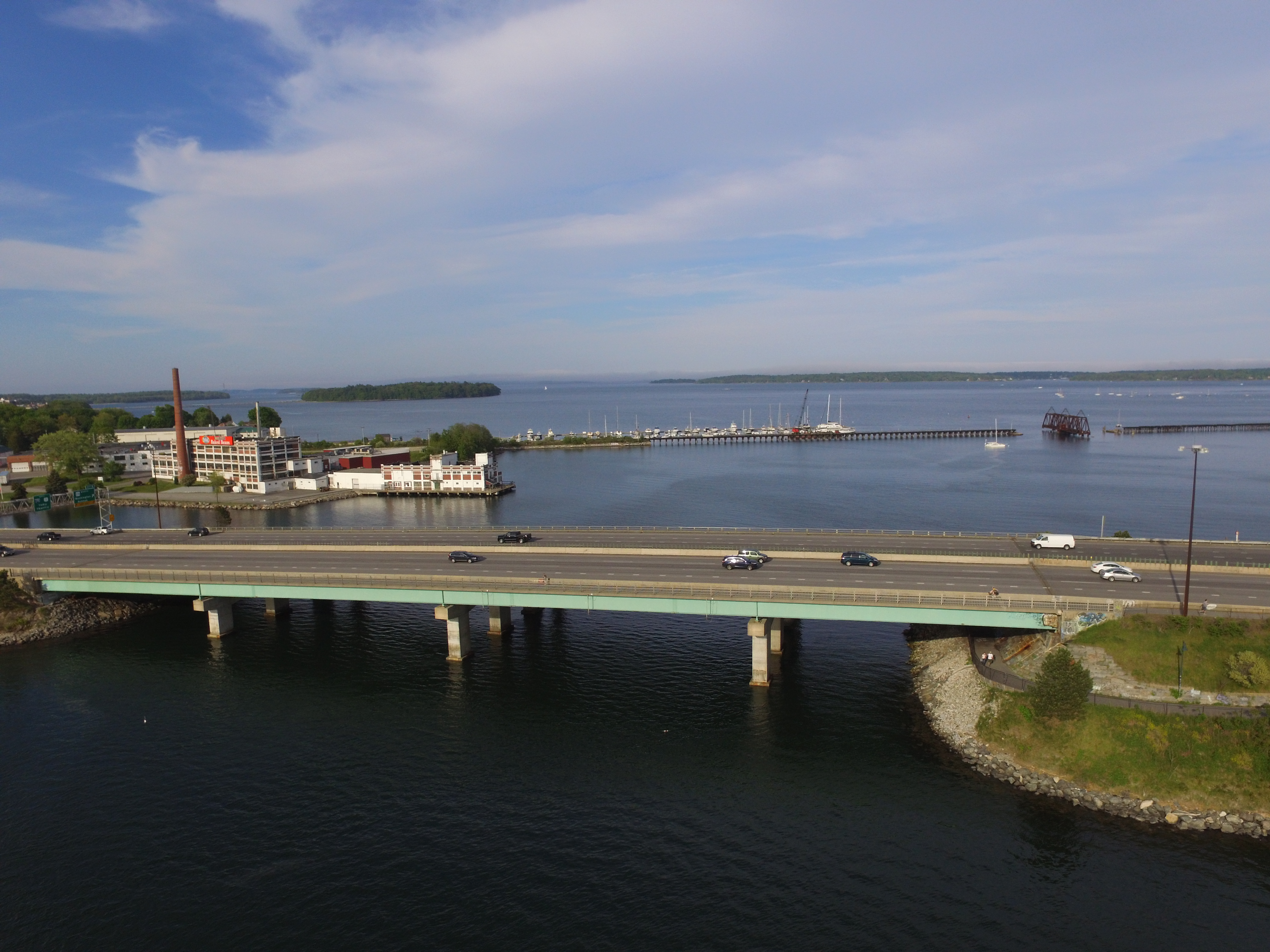
An aerial photo of the former B&M Baked Beans factory seen behind Tukey's Bridge and I-295 in 2016.

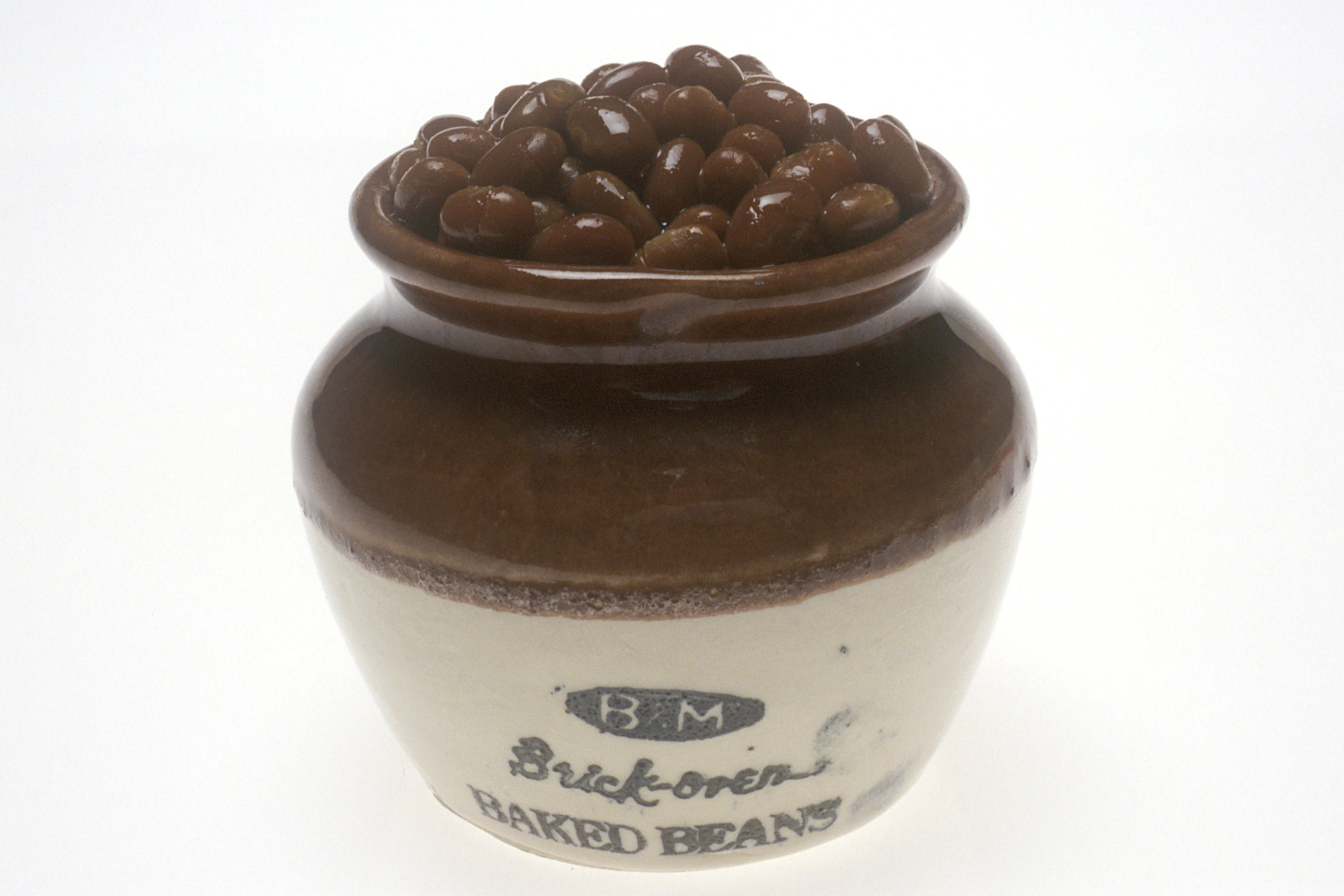
A large ceramic pot filled with B&M Brick Oven brand baked beans.

The B&M Baked Beans factory is a historic cannery building in Portland, Maine, United States. Constructed in 1913, in the East Deering neighborhood, it was built by the Burnham & Morrill Company. Baked beans were produced in the building until 2021. The building is a prominent landmark highly visible from Interstate 295. It is located at 1 Beanpot Circle.

The building was partly demolished in 2023, with the Roux Institute's Lunder Innovation Labs being incorporated into the remaining structure. It is expected to be completed in 2027.

== History ==
The Burnham and Morrill Co. began in 1867 on Franklin Street in Portland as a canning factory for vegetables, meat, and fish. The company constructed the B&M Baked Beans factory in 1913. The factory first produced canned beans in 1927. It used a traditional open-pot baking process with iron cauldrons that weighed 200 pounds attached to a ceiling-mounted rail system. The cauldrons were filled with beans, molasses, and other ingredients on the top floor of the factory and baked for hours. The cooked beans were dumped into a chute and went down to the canning line. The factory's smokestack was built in 1956.

In 2021, owner B&G Foods Inc. announced that the B&M Baked Beans factory would close. In August of that year the company removed the factory's brick smoke stack. In 2023, the new owner, Roux Institute, began demolition of ancillary factory buildings to make way for the construction of the Roux Institute campus. The red B&M Brick Oven Baked Beans sign was removed from the building in September 2023.

The closure of the plant moved the production of the baked beans to the midwest.

== Products ==
Products manufactured at the factory included multiple flavors of baked beans. The flavors were original, vegetarian, home style, country style, Boston style, bacon and onion, and maple flavor. The factory also made B&M brown bread, which comes in a can in plain and raisin flavors. B&M Baked Beans are made with pea beans. By late 2022, after production moved to the midwest, B&M customers were reporting that the baked beans were undercooked, crunchy, and tasted different. Customers speculated that the beans were no longer being baked. Some customers were hoarding B&M bean cans produced at the Portland plant.

== Roux Institute ==
Roux Institute's Lunder Innovation Labs, under construction here in 2026, incorporates part of the B&M Baked Beans factory

After its closure, it was sold to Northeastern University, which plans to develop the Roux Institute on the 13.5 acres (5.5 ha) property. In 2022, it was designated a landmark by the City of Portland. In 2023, the Portland City Council voted to rezone the property from industrial to mixed use and create an institutional overlay zone. Within five years, the institute expects to have built up to 250 units of housing on the site, and up to 650 units within 20 years.

Until its new campus is built, expected sometime in 2027, the Roux Institute operates out of a leased office building at 100 Fore Street. It has an enrollment of around 500 students.
