= India Street =

Downtown street in Portland, Maine

Coordinates: 43.660924°N 70.250623°W

- Broad Street (formerly); High King Street/King Street (formerly)
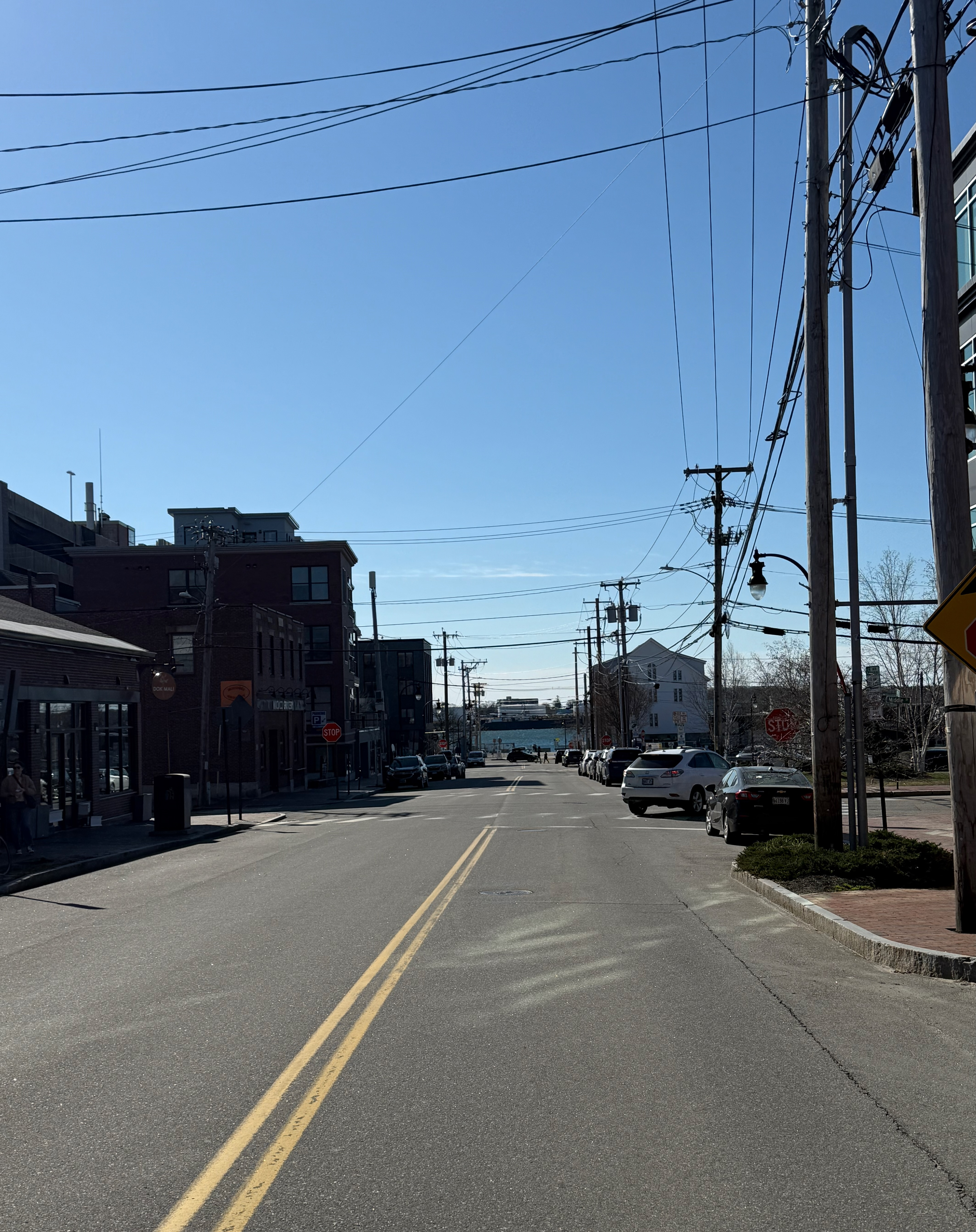
- Pictured in 2025, looking southeast toward the waterfront
- Interactive map of India Street
- Length: 0.28 mi (0.45 km)
- Location: Portland, Maine, U.S.
- Northwest end: Congress Street
- Southeast end: Commercial Street and Thames Street

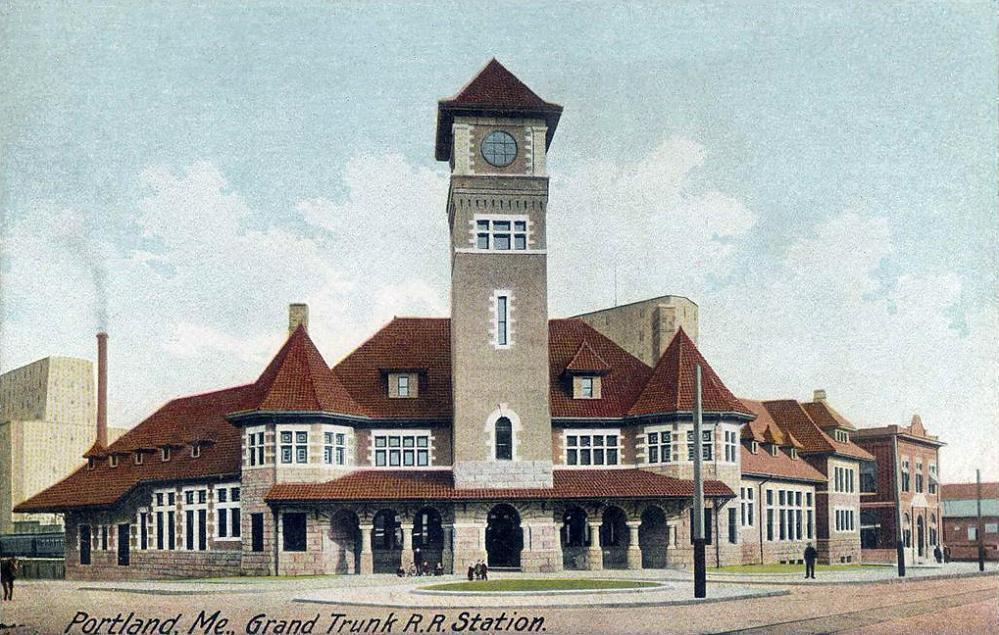
The former Grand Trunk Station, viewed in 1906 from the intersection of Fore Street and India Street

India Street is a downtown street and neighborhood in Portland, Maine, United States. Situated near the western foot of Munjoy Hill, it runs for around 0.28 miles (0.45 km), from Congress Street in the northwest to Commercial Street and Thames Street in the southeast. It was the city's first street, and the location of the first settlement of European immigrants to the city (then called Falmouth) in the 17th century. There are thirty handmade bricks in the sidewalk commemorating the neighborhood's notable events. In 1680, when Thomas Danforth was Deputy Governor of the Massachusetts Bay Colony, the street was known as Broad Street. After the incorporation of the Town of Falmouth in 1718, the street was known as High King Street (or King Street).

The neighborhood has been home to Europeans (1600s), African Americans (1700s), and Irish, Jews, Scots, Russians, Swiss and Portuguese (late 1800s).

One of Portland's four stations for the Portland and Forest Avenue Railroad Company was located at the foot of India Street, at its intersection with Commercial Street and Thames Street. Known as the Grand Trunk Station, it was built in 1903, when it was one of the two stations in the city, the other being the Union Station, on Saint John Street, which was demolished in 1961. Grand Trunk Station was demolished five years later, having stood for sixty-three years; its clock tower had been taken down in 1948. Its office building remains intact, at the corner of India Street and Thames Street, in use as a Gorham Savings Bank as of 2024.

Clay Cove, the home of early shipyards, stood at the foot of India Street in the 19th century. Atlantic Railroad Wharf was also in that area. It was demolished in the early 20th century, when Maine State Pier was constructed.

After Portland's great fire of 1866, a fire house was built at 97 India Street.

In the early 1950s, the newly created Slum Clearance and Redevelopment Authority highlighted Bayside and East Bayside as target neighborhoods due to its high number of immigrants and the decaying buildings caused by redlining. Residents of these neighborhoods resisted the discriminatory campaign. In 1958, the Authority demolished the Little Italy neighborhood, which spanned from the India Street neighborhood to the East Bayside neighborhood, razing 92 dwellings and 27 small businesses. Another 54 dwelling units were razed for the Bayside Park urban renewal project, an area that now includes Fox Field and Kennedy Park public housing. The first phase of the Kennedy Park was built in 1965. Several streets were truncated in an attempt to limit access to outside traffic. The razing of Franklin Street began in 1967; 130 homes and businesses were demolished and an unknown number of families relocated or were displaced.

The India Street Historic District was designated by Portland City Council in 2015 after a unanimous (8–0) vote. As a result, maximum building heights of 50 feet (15 m) were introduced on India Street, as well as parts of Commercial Street, Middle Street and Congress Street.

Etz Chaim Synagogue sits across from the head of India Street, at 267 Congress Street.

== Intersections ==
The following streets intersect with India Street (from north to south):

- Congress Street
- Federal Street
- Newbury Street
- Middle Street
- Fore Street

== Notable addresses ==
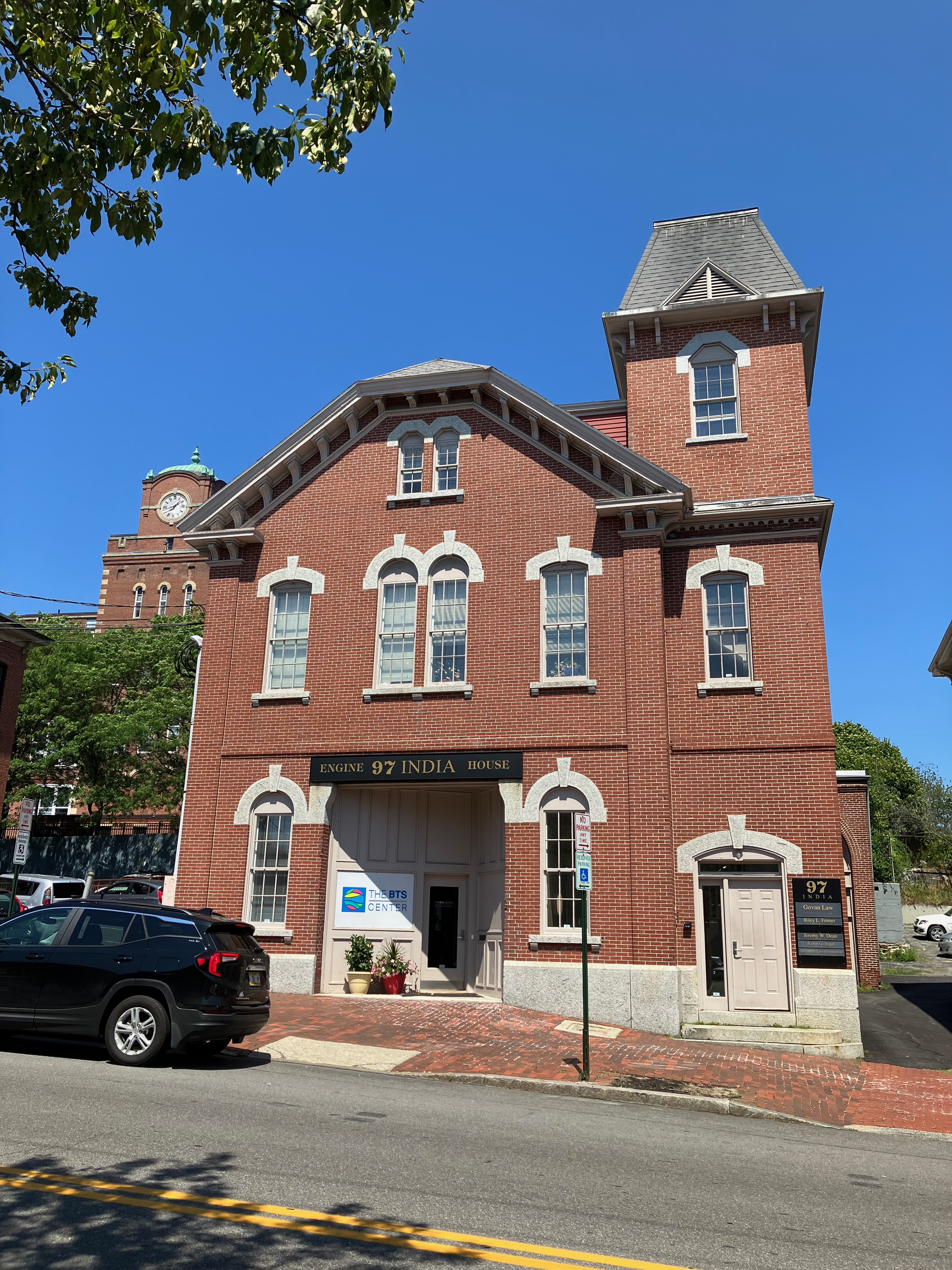
Engine House, 97 India Street

- Micucci Grocery Store, 45 India Street (opened by Emilio and Iris Micucci in 1951)
- Amato's Sandwich Shop, 71 India Street (original store, opened in 1902 by Giovanni and Michelina Amato)
- 93–95 India Street
- Engine House, 97 India Street (1867)

Portland's first masonic hall stood on King Street (where 35 India Street is today). The ground floor was the home of Dr. Nathaniel Coffin; the second floor was the "Assembly Room", rented to the Freemasons in 1795 and 1796.

The Grand Trunk Smoke Shop formerly stood at 30–36 India Street (with an alternative address of 199–205 Fore Street).

The former home of Elias and Elizabeth Widgery Thomas, at the corner of India and Congress Street, has a granite marker on the Portland Freedom Trail. The home was destroyed in the 1866 fire.

Sanitary Meat Market (established in 1914; later Jordan's Ready to Eat Meats) formerly occupied the western corner of the Fore Street and India Street intersection. It is now a parking lot. The factory, owned by Tyson, ceased operation in 2005.

== Public transportation ==
Greater Portland Metro's route 8 (Peninsula Loop) serves India Street.

== Gallery ==
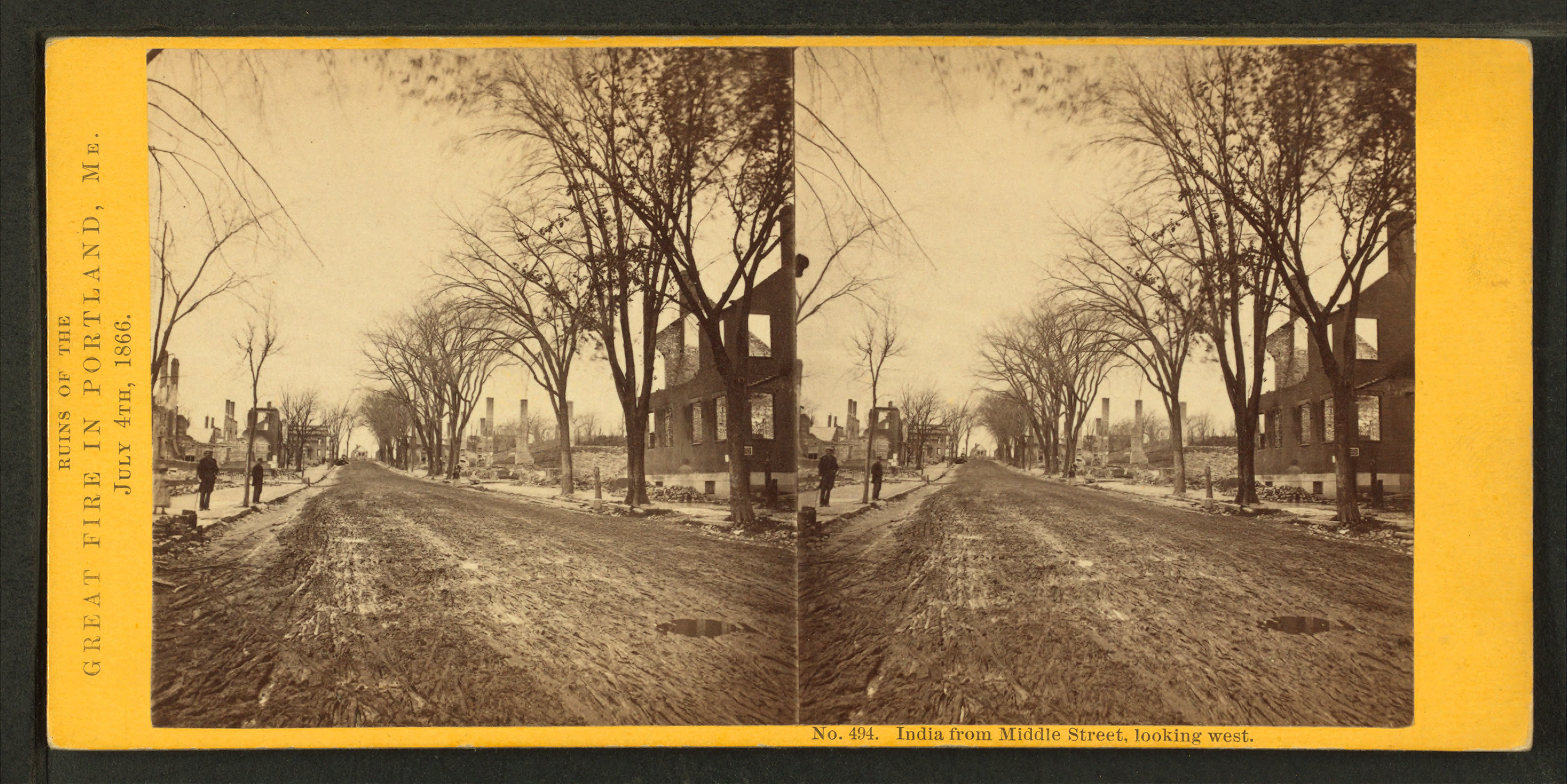
India Street, near its intersection with Middle Street, after the great fire of 1866

== See also ==
- List of Italian-American neighborhoods
