= The Maine Lobsterman =

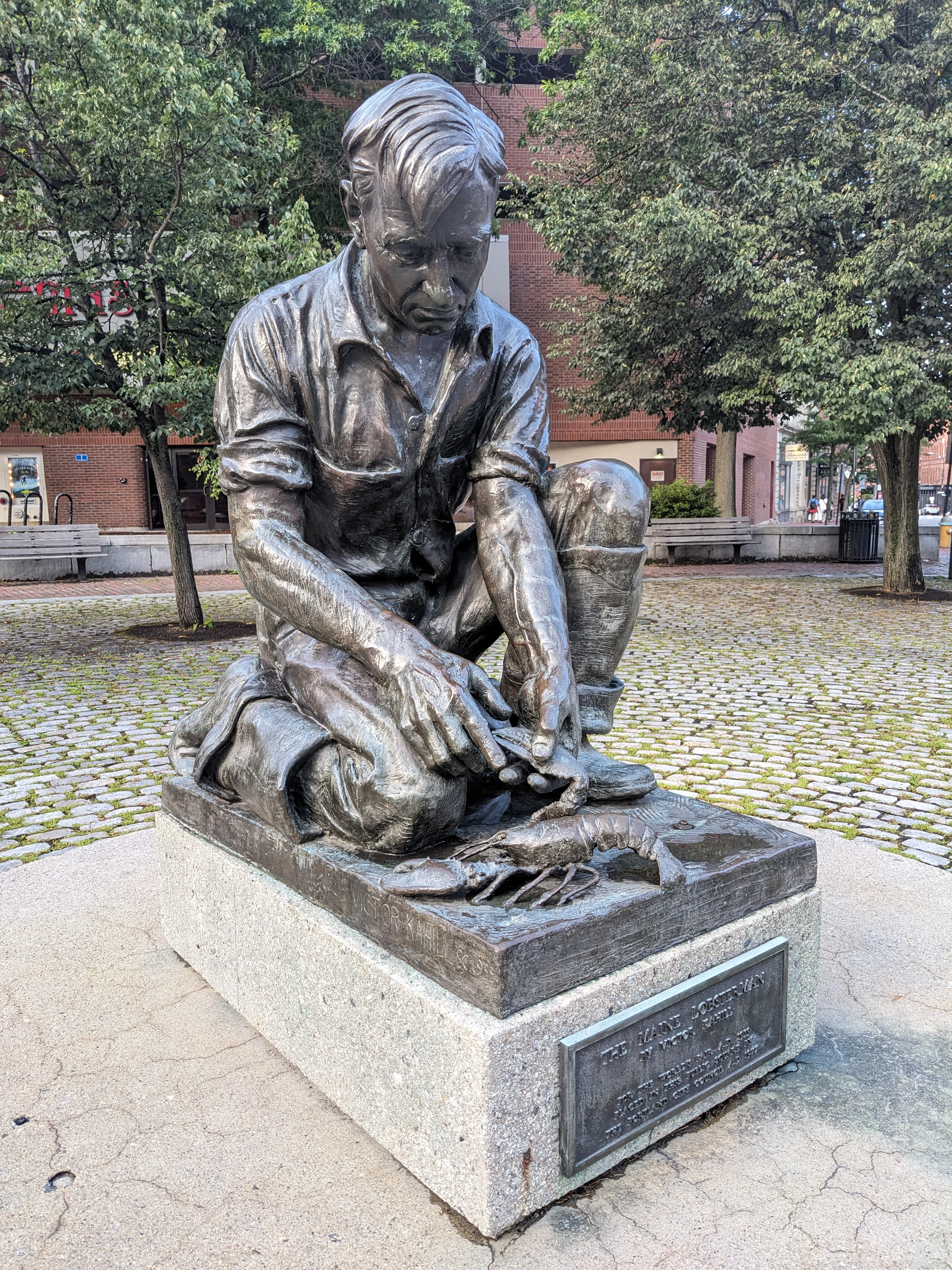
- Year: 1939
- Location: United States
- Coordinates: 43°39′26″N 70°15′22″W

The Maine Lobsterman is a bronze statue in Lobsterman Park, Portland, Maine, United States. Standing at the intersection of Middle Street and Temple Street, it serves as a monument to the state's fishing industry and its workers.

The original sculpture was created by Victor Kahill for the 1939 New York World's Fair and served as the centerpiece of the Maine exhibit in the Hall of States. While the original plaster model had a history of display and storage, three bronze replicas were cast in the 1970s and placed in Portland, Maine, Bailey Island, Maine, and Washington, D.C.

== History ==
In the late 1930s, the State of Maine commissioned Portland sculptor Victor Kahill to create a monument that would embody the spirit of Maine for the 1939 New York World's Fair. Kahill designed a figure of a lobsterman kneeling to peg the claw of a lobster. Although the statue was intended to be cast in bronze, due to lack of funding, Kahill painted the plaster model with bronze-colored finish to display at the fair.

After the World's Fair concluded, the plaster statue was returned to Portland. It was displayed in the lobby of the Columbia Hotel and later in the rotunda of Portland City Hall. Eventually, it was moved to the basement of the City Hall, where it suffered damage from vandalism, neglect, and the infestation of rats. In 1958, it was partially restored and moved to the Sea and Shore Fisheries Museum in Boothbay Harbor, but it eventually returned to storage.

== Castings and Replicas ==
Following the death of the statue's model, H. Elroy Johnson, in 1973, the Maine Legislature appropriated funds to cast the statue in bronze as originally intended. Sculptor Norman Therrien was hired to cast three replicas from the original plaster mold.

1. Portland, Maine: This copy sits in Lobsterman Park (public square at the corner of Middle and Temple Streets). It acts as a major landmark for the city.
2. Bailey Island, Maine: A second copy was placed at the hometown of the model, H. Elroy Johnson.
3. Washington, D.C.: A third copy stands on the Southwest Waterfront along Maine Avenue. Installation was made possible by the Camp Fire Girls of Cundy's Harbor, Maine, who raised $30,000 to fund its creation and transportation.

== Reception and Controversy ==
In 2021, the Portland Press Herald described it as one of the most iconic landmarks in the city.

In July 2022, the animal rights non-profit People for the Ethical Treatment of Animals sent a letter to mayor Kate Snyder urging the city replace the sculpture with another sculpture showing a lobster crushing a trap. They argued that the current state glorified the killing of sensitive animals. The request drew national attention but did not result in the statue's removal.
