= Thompson Block =

- U.S. National Register of Historic Places
- U.S. Historic district – Contributing property
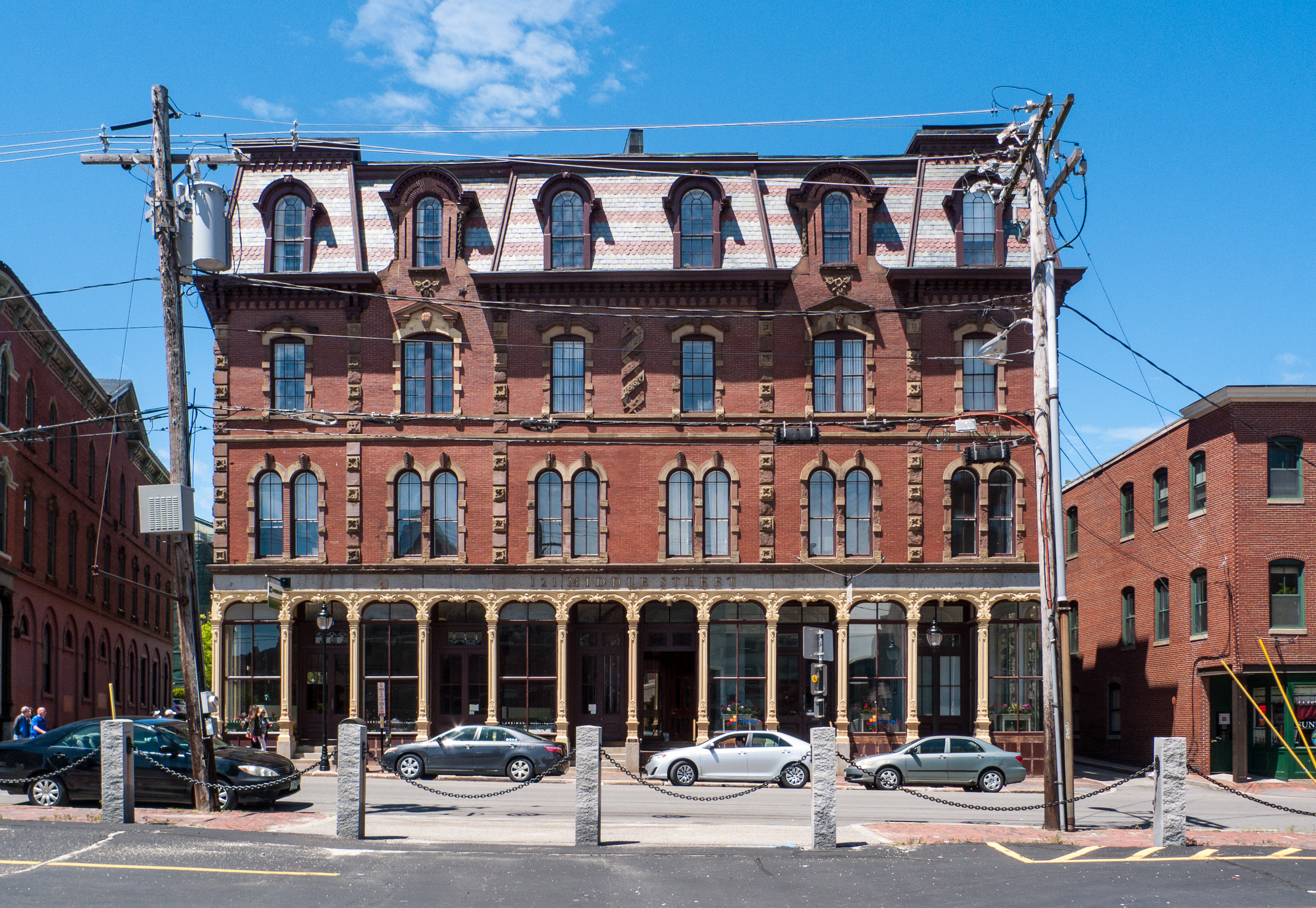
- Pictured in 2017

- Location within Maine Location within the United States
- Location: 117–125 Middle Street, Portland, Maine
- Coordinates: 43°39′32″N 70°15′11″W
- Area: less than one acre
- Built: 1867
- Architect: Harding, George M.
- Architectural style: Late Victorian
- Part of: Portland Waterfront (ID74000353)
- NRHP reference No.: 73000127

Significant dates
- Added to NRHP: February 28, 1973
- Designated CP: May 2, 1974

The Thompson Block is a historic commercial building located at 117–125 Middle Street in downtown Portland, Maine. It was designed by architect George M. Harding and constructed in 1867. Along with the neighboring Rackleff and Woodman Buildings (also Harding designs), it forms one of the best-preserved period commercial street views in the entire state. The building was added to the National Register of Historic Places on February 28, 1973.

== Description and history ==
The Thompson Block is located in Portland's Old Port area, on the north side of Middle Street at what was the head of the now-demolished Deer Street. It is flanked on the left side by the Rackleff Building, which stands across Church Street, and by a less ornate brick commercial building on the right, across a narrow alley. It is a 3 1/2-story brick building, roughly trapezoidal in shape, with a polychrome slate mansard roof providing a full fourth floor. The ground floor consists of an arcade of iron supports, forming arches over either display windows or recessed store entries. A stone entablature separates the ground floor from the next two floors. These floors are divided into six bays, articulated in a 1-1-2-1-1 pattern by stone piers, and each floor is also delineated horizontally by rusticated stone beltcourses above and below the windows. Windows on the second floor are paired round-arch windows with keystones, while third-floor windows have segmented-arch tops with stone hoods. Two of these are more ornate, rising into wall dormers that interrupt the bracketed and dentillated cornice. Dormers at the roof level have round-arch windows with keystoned and eared hoods.

The block was built in 1867–1868, in the wake of Portland's great 1866 fire. George M. Harding, who designed the Thompson Block and the adjacent Rackleff and Woodman buildings, played a major role in the rebuilding effort, and this trio of buildings represent some of his finest commercial work. Urban renewal of the 20th century resulted in the loss of a significant number of other period buildings, and this is one of the few places in the city where the typical rebuilt post-fire streetscape is to be seen.

== See also ==
- National Register of Historic Places listings in Cumberland County, Maine
