= Roux Institute =

Graduate school and research center of Northeastern University in Portland, Maine

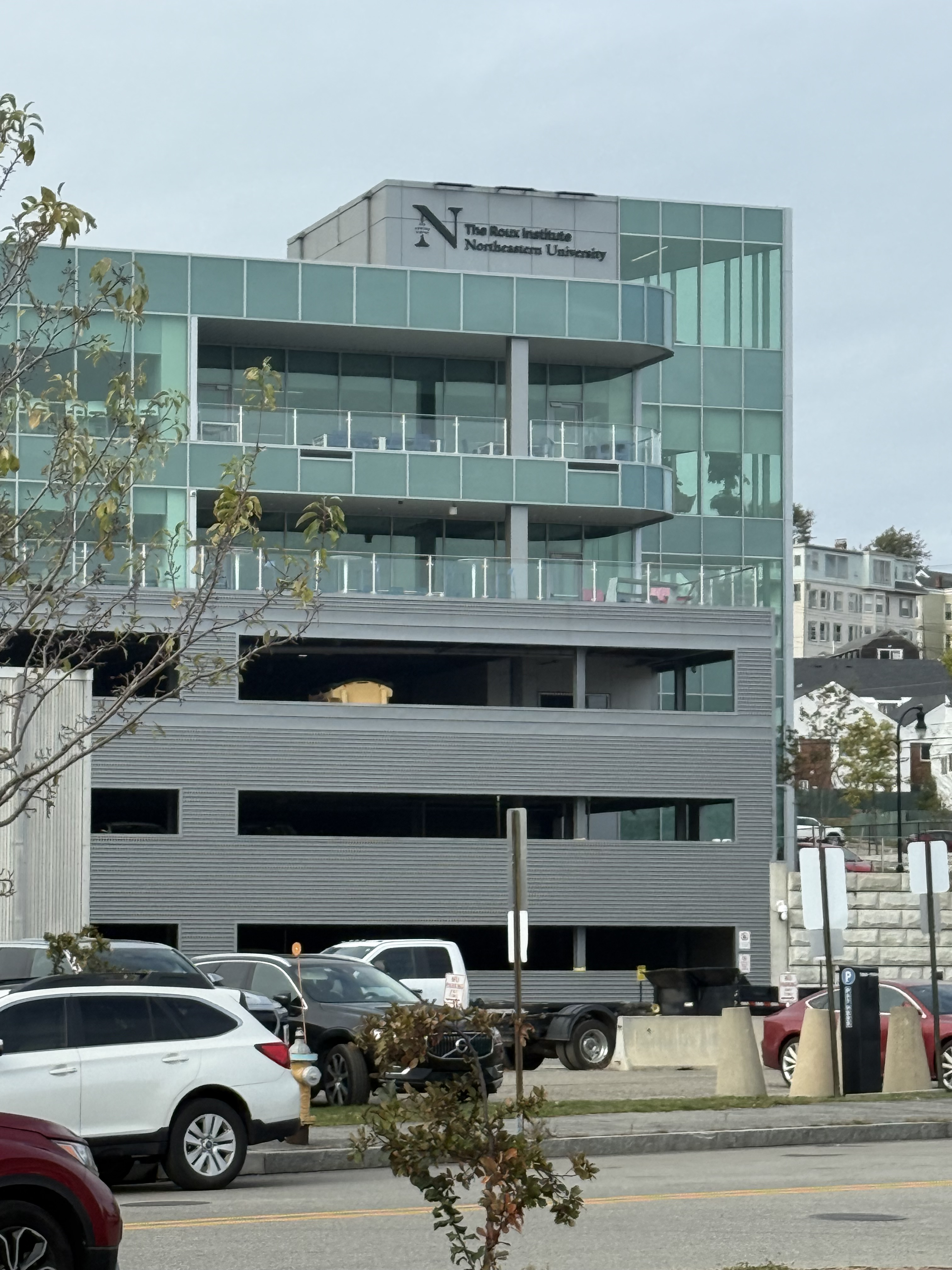
- Current location, on Fore Street
- Type: Private; Graduate campus
- Established: 2020
- Parent institution: Northeastern University
- Location: 100 Fore Street, Portland, Maine, U.S. 43°39′42″N 70°14′49″W
- Campus: Urban
- Language: English
- Website: roux.northeastern.edu

The Roux Institute is a graduate campus and research center affiliated with Northeastern University and located in Portland, Maine. The Roux Institute is currently located in the WEX Inc. headquarters at 100 Fore Street in downtown Portland. A new campus is under construction at the site of the former B&M Baked Beans factory, which is anticipated to open in 2027.

== History ==
=== Planning ===
After a year of development, the institute was announced by Northeastern on January 27, 2020, along with an announcement of a $100 million gift from David Roux and his wife, Barbara.

David Roux lived in Lewiston, Maine, in his youth, but found success outside the state, becoming a technology entrepreneur and investor and co-founder of Silver Lake. However, Roux wanted to do more to promote the technology sector in Maine and began looking to partner with an existing university to increase research and education opportunities in the state. Beginning in 2019, Roux partnered with Northeastern University to develop the institute, agreeing to contribute $100 million towards its development and operations. The Harold Alfond Foundation donated an additional $100 million in October 2020.

On August 30, 2021, a nonprofit called the Institute for Digital Engineering and Life Sciences announced it was acquiring the historic B&M Baked Beans factory at the mouth of Back Cove, with the intent of redeveloping the property into a campus for the Roux Institute.

Roux believed that the institute's success would hinge on three factors: a credible university partner, many corporate partners, and "a big pile of money." He termed this the "Maine Model" for how to replicate the successes of major technology hubs without the same kind of educational and financial capital found in those places. Major Maine businesses including L.L.Bean, Bangor Savings Bank, Unum, The Jackson Laboratories, Wex, and Idexx Laboratories signed on to co-develop the institute's curriculum.

=== Operations ===
Roux's inaugural class began in 2020 and graduated in 2022. In contrast to Northeastern's other regional campuses in Seattle and Burlington, Massachusetts, which primarily focus either on graduate education or advanced research, the Roux Institute engages in both.

== Academics ==
=== Clean Tech Incubator ===
In 2023, the Roux Institute received $975,000 from the Maine Governor’s Energy Office to develop the Clean Tech Incubator. The Incubator aims to attract and grow up to 40 tech startups over the next two years.

=== Computer science ===
The Roux Institute offers graduate degrees in computer science. In 2022, it established a partnership with Bowdoin College and Colby College that allows students to take courses toward their master’s degree at the Roux Institute while still enrolled as an undergraduate student.

=== Future of Healthcare Founder Residency ===
Launched in 2023, the Future of Healthcare Founder Residency is funded by Northern Light Health and MaineHealth. It is a three-month intensive program for healthcare companies offering access to international experts within the company's field. Participating companies are co-located on the Roux Institute's campus during the residency.

== Campus ==
=== Temporary campus ===
While the permanent campus is under construction, the Roux Institute has a temporary campus located at 100 Fore Street in 44,000 square feet of classroom space. The temporary campus is located in financial services provider Wex's corporate headquarters building in downtown Portland. In 2023, 70 Roux students were housed in the redeveloped Mercy Hospital on State Street.

=== Future campus ===
The parking garage of the campus, pictured in 2026. Lunder Innovation Labs, under construction in the background, incorporates the former B&M Baked Beans factory.

The Roux Institute campus is being built in the East Deering neighborhood on a waterfront parcel. According to the developers, the new campus will feature public waterfront access as well as publicly-accessible paths and trails. The 13.5-acre campus will include the former B&M Baked Beans factory building, which is frequently described as an "iconic" part of the city, while the other buildings on the site have been demolished. The approved site plan calls for a 238,000 square foot academic building designed by CambridgeSeven, a parking garage and a child-care facility. The Roux Institute will build up to 250 student housing units in the first five years, and up to 650 units within two decades. Plans also call for adding a hotel and retail.

An initial proposal for the campus on the site was met with criticism and was scaled back by 27%. The site is being designed to account for sea level rise and climate change. The existing pier is being raised higher and bike storage is being planned to occupy the first floor of the former B&M Baked Beans factory, which will accommodate office space. The campus will be built as an all-electric campus using geothermal wells and heat pumps for energy supply.

== Reception ==
Inside Higher Ed's Lindsay McKenzie wrote that Maine's public universities "perhaps surprisingly" welcomed the announcement of the Roux Institute. Joan Ferrini-Mundy, president of the University of Maine, said the two universities would develop "pathways programs" as the first step towards a deeper partnership. Most of Maine's colleges and universities are primarily undergraduate-oriented, which McKenzie wrote could mean opportunities for those colleges to provide potential students for the Roux Institute.

== Founder Residency ==
Since its establishment, the Roux Institute’s Founder Residency has annually selected ten early‑stage, technology‑based startups—particularly those led by underrepresented founders—to participate in a year‑long, equity‑light accelerator hosted at its Portland, Maine campus. The 2024 cohort included bio plastic producer Dirigo seafarm, AI Powered Friendship App Pulse Meet New Friends and 8 other startups.

== See also ==
- List of postgraduate-only institutions
