= Fore Street (Portland, Maine) =

Street in Portland, Maine, United States

Coordinates: 43.65649837°N 70.25332479°W

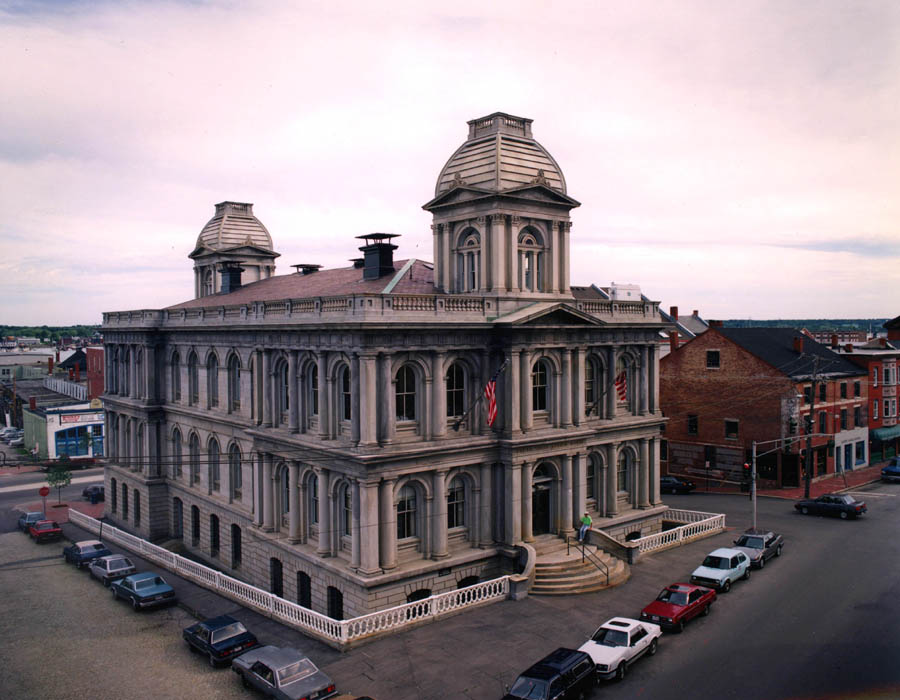
- Fore Street's United States Custom House, pictured in 2003
- Interactive map of Fore Street
- Length: 1.00 mi (1.61 km)
- Location: Portland, Maine, U.S.
- Northeast end: Eastern Promenade & Atlantic Street
- Southwest end: Pleasant, York, & Center Streets

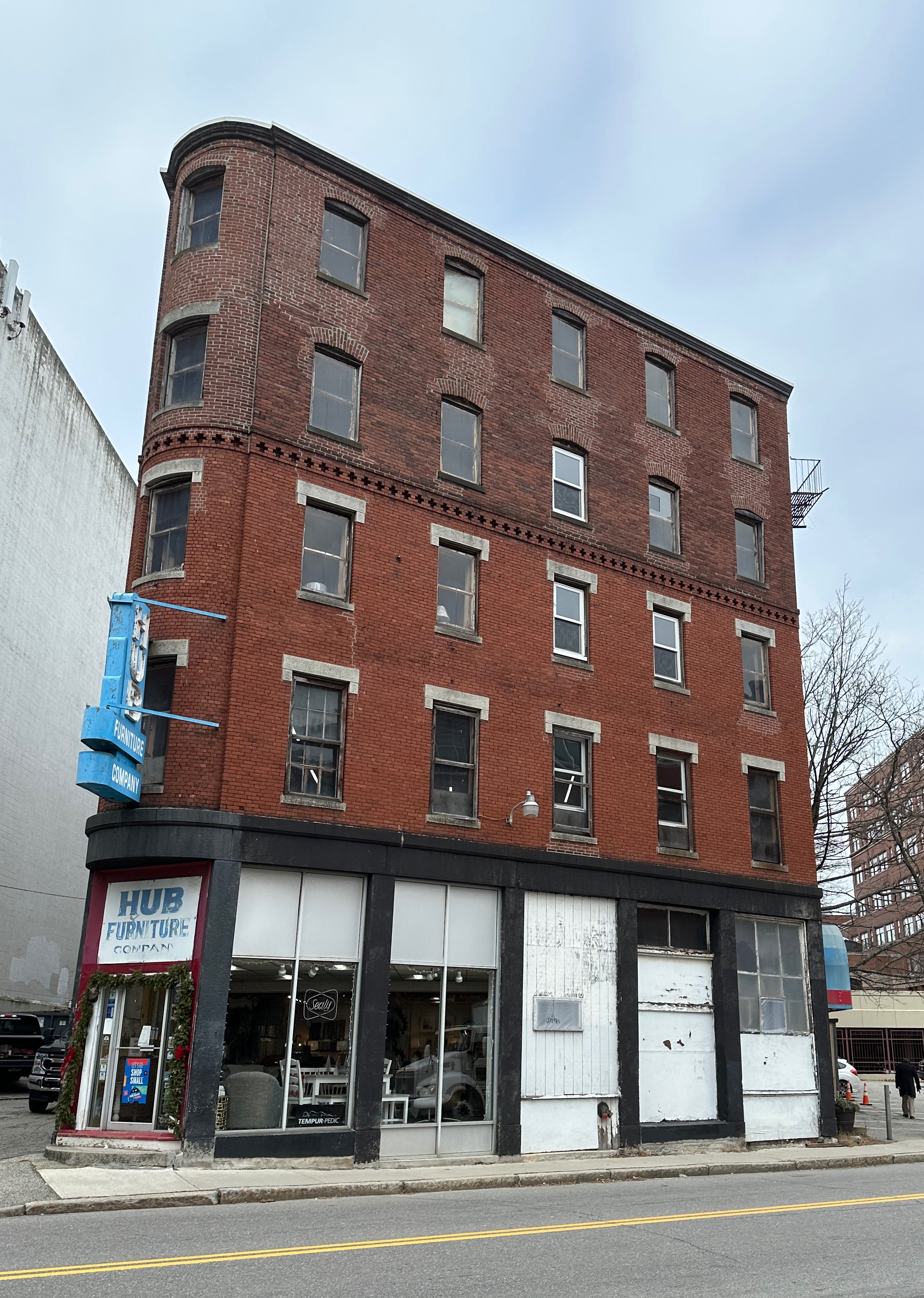
Hub furniture store, 291 Fore Street

Fore Street is a downtown street in Portland, Maine, United States. Dating to 1724, it runs for around 1 mile (1.6 km), from the Eastern Promenade on Munjoy Hill in the northeast to Pleasant Street in the southwest. Near its midsection, Fore Street crosses Franklin Street. It splits briefly at Boothby Square, shortly after passing the United States Custom House. The street passes through the Old Port district.

== History ==
Fore Street was the original waterfront of Portland's Old Port, prior to the reclamation of land which resulted in today's Commercial Street in the early 20th century. The street was laid out in 1724 to the foot of Exchange Street on the west side of Clay Cove, the location of the Nathaniel Dyer Shipyard. Clay Cove caused Fore Street to curve away from the Fore River between India Street and Pearl Street, to which Fore Street was not connected until 1765.

In the early 1950s, the newly created Slum Clearance and Redevelopment Authority Vine-Deer-Chatham project demolished Portland's Little Italy, which was bounded by Franklin Street to the east, Fore Street to the south, Pearl Street to the west and Middle Street to the north. The head of Deer Street was opposite the Thompson Block at 117–125 Middle Street.

== Notable addresses ==
From southwest to northeast:

- 505–509 Fore Street, Tracy-Causer Block is a historic commercial building built in 1866.
- 396 Fore Street, Gritty McDuff's, near the foot of Exchange Street, has been in business since 1988.
- 368–374 Fore Street, Mariner's Church is a historic church and commercial building built in 1828.
- 334 Fore Street, the Samuel Butts House (also known as the Samuel Butts House and Store; formerly known as the Mariner's House) is a historic colonial-style building built in 1792. It is the second-oldest extant building on the Portland peninsula. Formerly located on the building was The Hollow Reed restaurant. In operation between1974 and 1981, it is cited for its influence on the city's restaurant culture.
- 312 Fore Street, the United States Custom House completed in 1872.
- 291 Fore Street, The Hub furniture store (formerly the Curtis & Son Gum Factory), near the intersection with Franklin Street, has been in business since 1913. In the early and mid-20th century, it was located on Congress Street.
- 288 Fore Street, Fore Street restaurant was established in 1996.
- 159–161 Fore Street (now demolished), the birthplace of Henry Wadsworth Longfellow.
- 100 Fore Street, temporary campus of the Roux Institute, graduate campus and research center affiliated with Northeastern University.
- 58 Fore Street, the former Portland Company railroad factory at the waterfront below Munjoy Hill.

=== Hotels ===
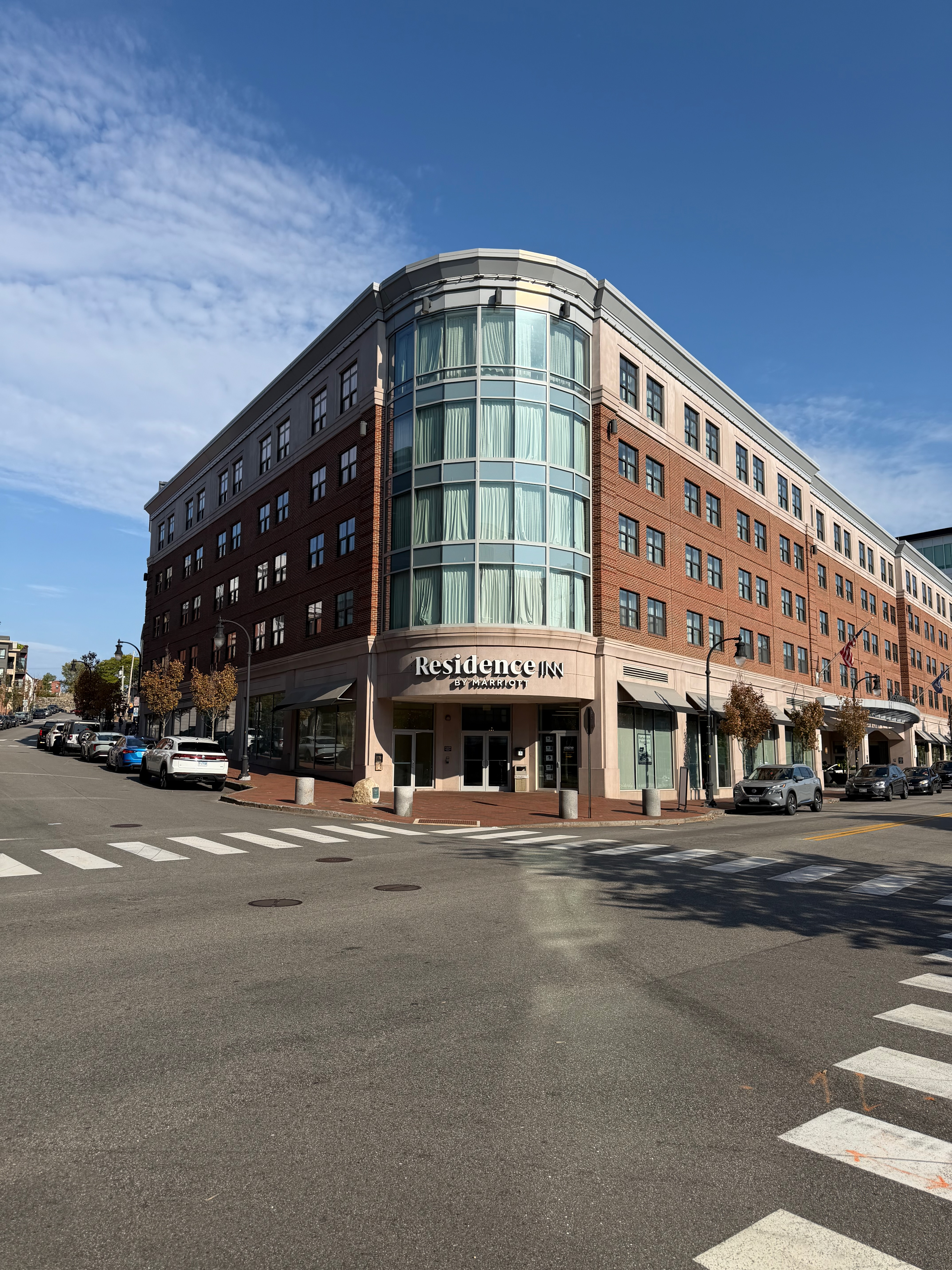
Residence Inn by Marriott, at Fore Street and Hancock Street

In recent years, a number of hotels have located on Fore Street due to its location in the Old Port tourist district. The oldest is the Portland Regency Hotel & Spa, which opened in 1987 in the historic armory building spanning from Milk Street to Fore Street. More recently built hotels with frontage on Fore Street include the Portland Harbor Hotel, the Hyatt Place Portland Old Port Hotel, the Hampton Inn Portland Downtown Waterfront Hotel, the AC by Marriott Portland Downtown Hotel, and the Residence Inn by Marriott Portland Downtown Hotel.

=== Historical sites ===
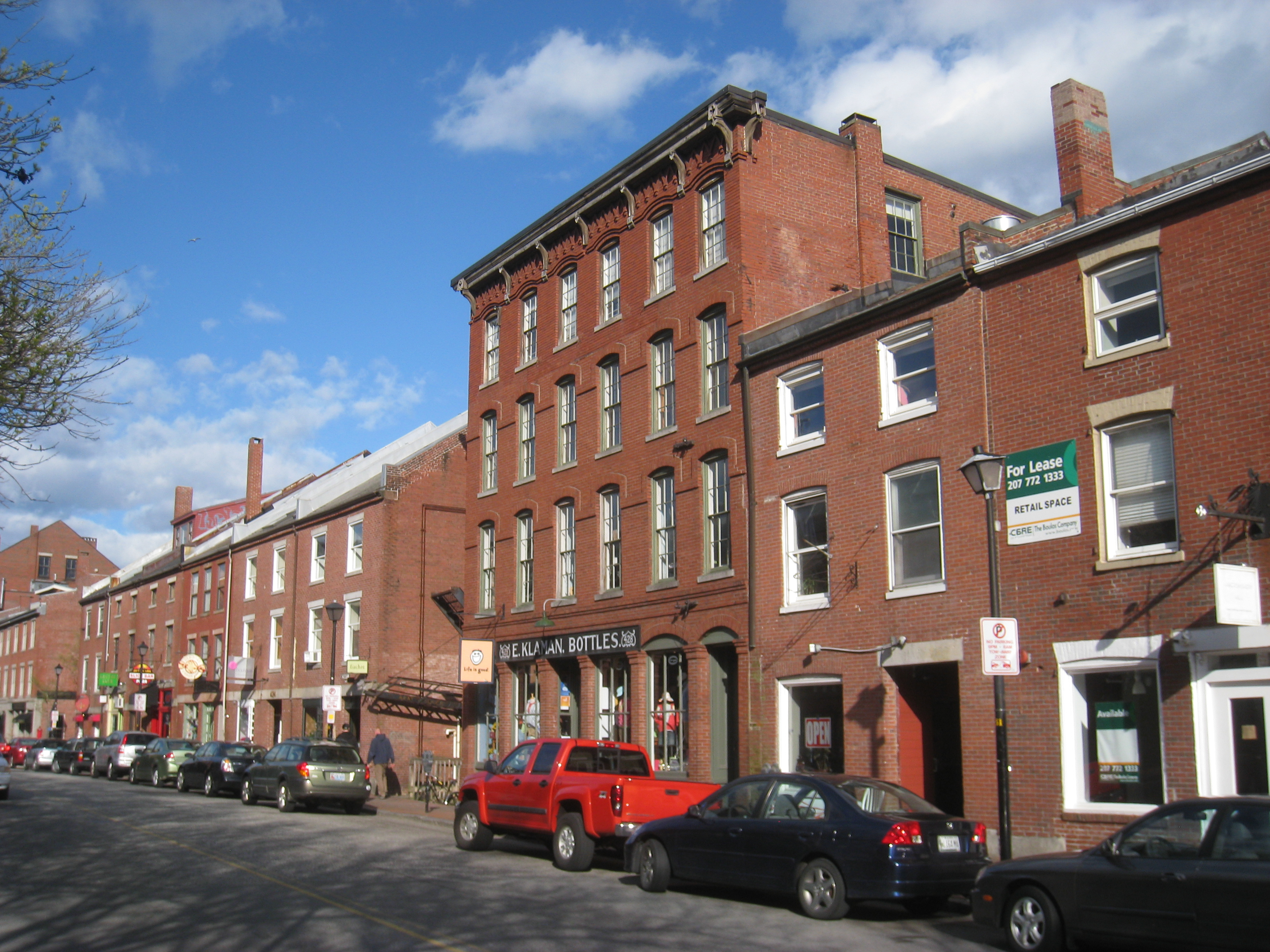
The section of Fore Street which runs between Union Street in the west and Dana Street in the east

At the corner of Fore and Moulton, there is a Portland Freedom Trail marker for the anti-slavery bookstore and a printshop run by Daniel Colesworthy.

The Boothby Square Watering Trough was first installed in 1902 as part of the City Beautiful movement.

At Fore Street's southwest terminus is the location of the John Ford Statue, a bronze statue of American film director and Portland High School graduate John Ford that was installed in 1998.

The corner of Fore Street and Mountfort Street was the site of George Munjoy's fortified home, known as Munjoy's Garrison.

Deacon Brown Thurston's home formerly stood where the Portland Harbor Hotel, at the corner of Fore Street and Union Street, is today.

== Wharves ==
Given that Fore Street was once the waterfront, several wharves existed along it during the 18th century. They include (from east to west):

- Waite's Wharf
- Stephenson's Wharf
- Pote's Wharf
- Goodwin's Wharf
- Preble's Wharf (foot of today's India Street)
- Tyng's Wharf (foot of Fiddle Lane; replaced by today's Franklin Street; at Clay Cove)
- Pearson's Wharf (foot of Pearson's Lane; now Pearl Street)
- Cox's Wharf (between Fish Street and Pearson's Lane)
- Deering's Wharf (foot of Fish Street)
- Waite's Wharf (between Jones Lane and Fish Street)

== See also ==
- Gorham's Corner
