= Middle Street =

Street in Portland, Maine, United States

Coordinates: 43.65649837°N 70.25332479°W

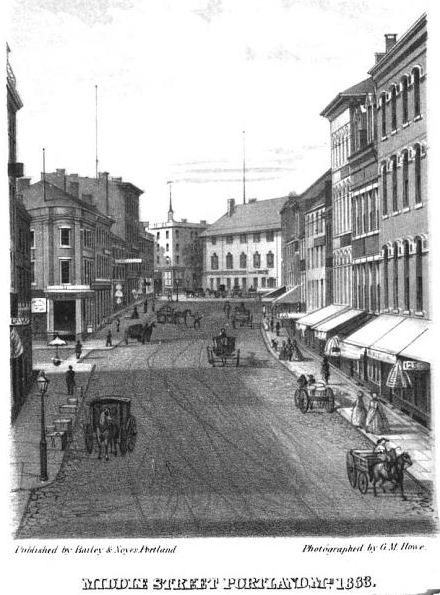
- An 1863 view of the now-pedestrianized section of Middle Street between today's Monument Square and Free Street
- Interactive map of Middle Street
- Length: 0.46 mi (0.74 km)
- Location: Portland, Maine, U.S.
- Northeast end: Hancock Street
- Southwest end: Union, Spring, & Temple Streets

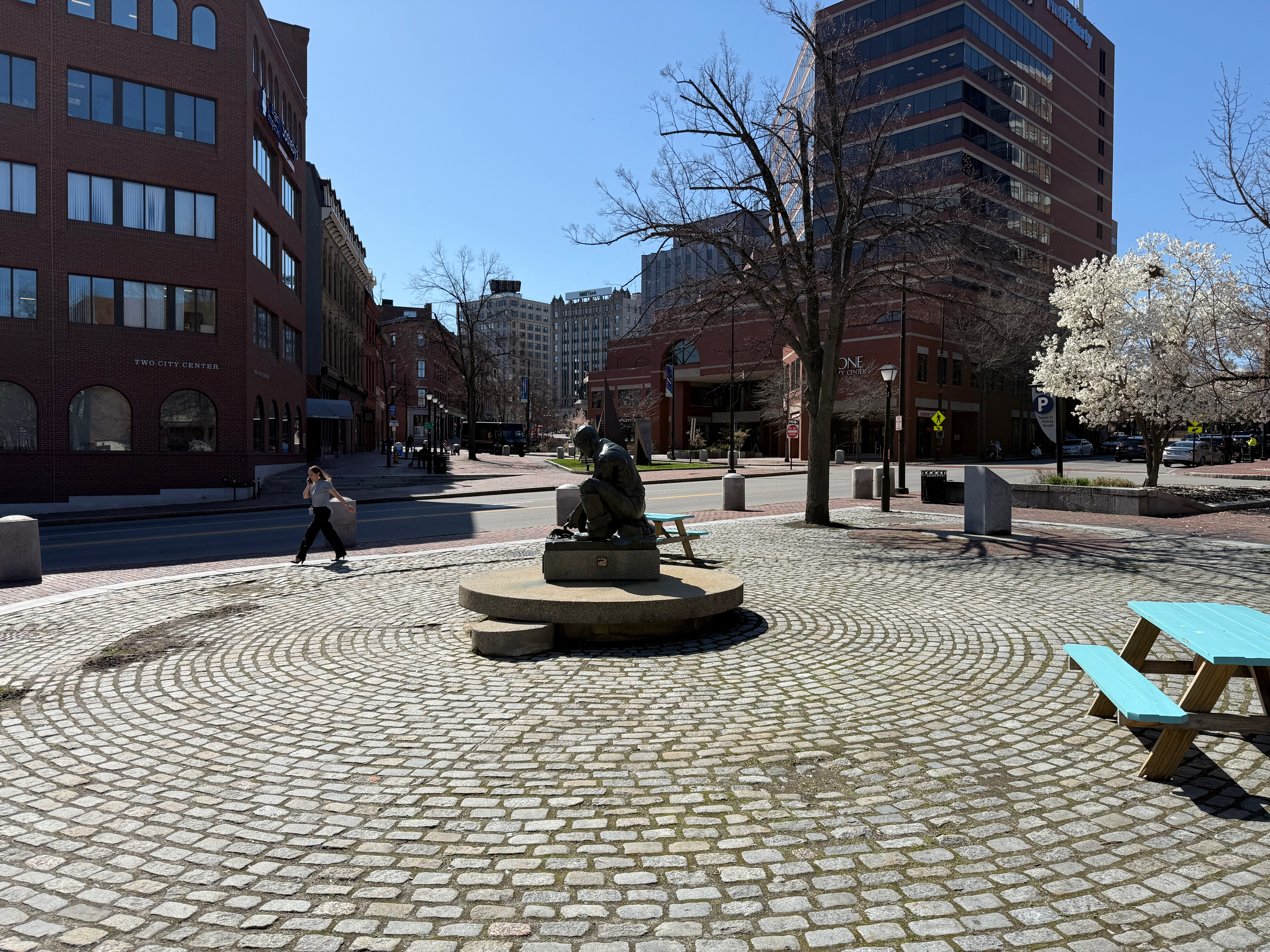
The former route of Middle Street, which led to and from Monument Square. It is now pedestrianized

Middle Street is a downtown street in Portland, Maine, United States. Dating to 1724 (although part of it was a path established by ancient settlers), it runs for around 0.46 miles (0.74 km), from an intersection with Union Street, Spring Street and Temple Street in the southwest, to Hancock Street, at the foot of Munjoy Hill, in the northeast. It formerly originated at what was then known as Market Square (today's Monument Square), but 20th-century redevelopment saw the section between Monument Square and Free Street pedestrianized, and the remaining section—around The Maine Lobsterman monument on Temple Street—erased.

Near its midsection, Middle Street crosses Franklin Street. In 1756, when Franklin Street was laid out between Middle Street and Back Street (today's Congress Street), it was known as Fiddle Street.

In the early 1950s, the newly created Slum Clearance and Redevelopment Authority Vine-Deer-Chatham project demolished Portland's Little Italy, which was bounded by Franklin Street to the east, Fore Street to the south, Pearl Street to the west and Middle Street to the north. The head of Deer Street was opposite the Thompson Block at 117–125 Middle Street.

Middle Street, which is named for its position between Congress Street and Fore Street, passes through Portland's Old Port district. A creek once flowed up from Clay Cove, the original commercial center of Portland, to Turkey Lane (today's Newbury Street). It was large enough that ships used to sail up it past Middle Street, where an arch was built over the creek.

== Notable addresses ==
From northeast to southwest:

- Abraham S. Levy Building, 78–88 Middle Street
- Portland Police Headquarters, 109 Middle Street
- Thompson Block, 117–125 Middle Street (listed on the National Register of Historic Places)
- Rackleff Building, 129–131 Middle Street (listed on the National Register of Historic Places)
- Woodman Building, 133–141 Middle Street (listed on the National Register of Historic Places)
- Post Office Park, Middle Street between Market Street and Exchange Street
- Tommy's Park, Middle Street and Exchange Street
- Canal Bank Building, 188 Middle Street
- The Maine Lobsterman statue, Middle Street and Temple Street

At the time of his death in 1807, 46-year-old Commodore Edward Preble was living on Middle Street.

=== Demolished buildings ===
The Samuel Freeman House, built in the late 18th century, formerly stood on Middle Street.

The Second Parish Congregational Church stood at the corner of Middle Street and Deer Street. Deer Street, now a parking lot, was opposite the Thompson Block, just northeast of Pearl Street.

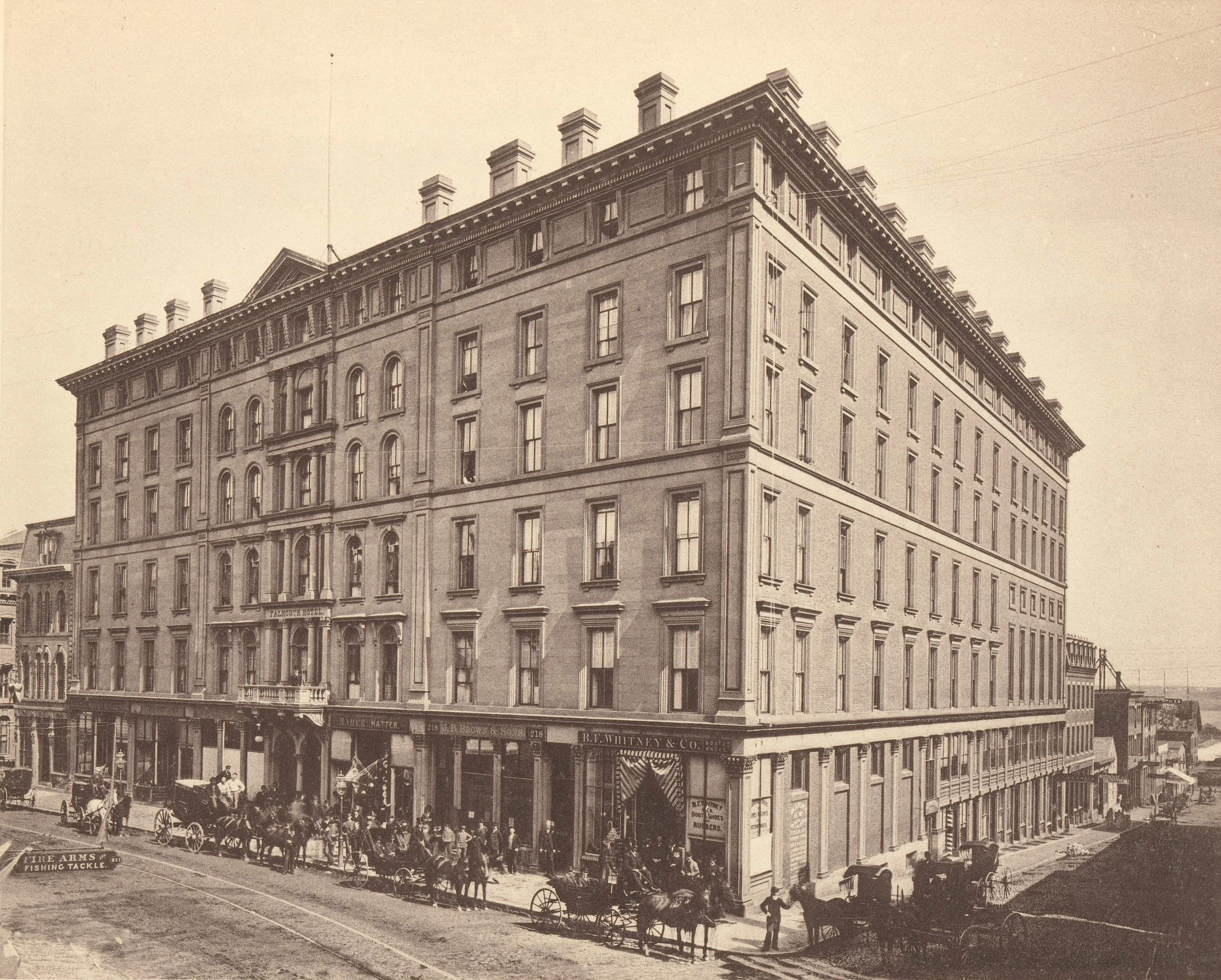
The former Falmouth Hotel

The 240-room, six-story Falmouth Hotel stood at 212 Middle Street between 1868 and 1963, when it was torn down for being a fire hazard. It was replaced by today's Canal Bank Plaza in 1971.

Sanitary Meat Market (established in 1914) formerly occupied the southern corner of the Middle Street and India Street intersection. It is now a parking lot.

== See also ==
- Portland Railroad Company
