= Exchange Street (Maine) =

Coordinates: 43°39′26″N 70°15′16.4″W

- Fish Street (formerly)
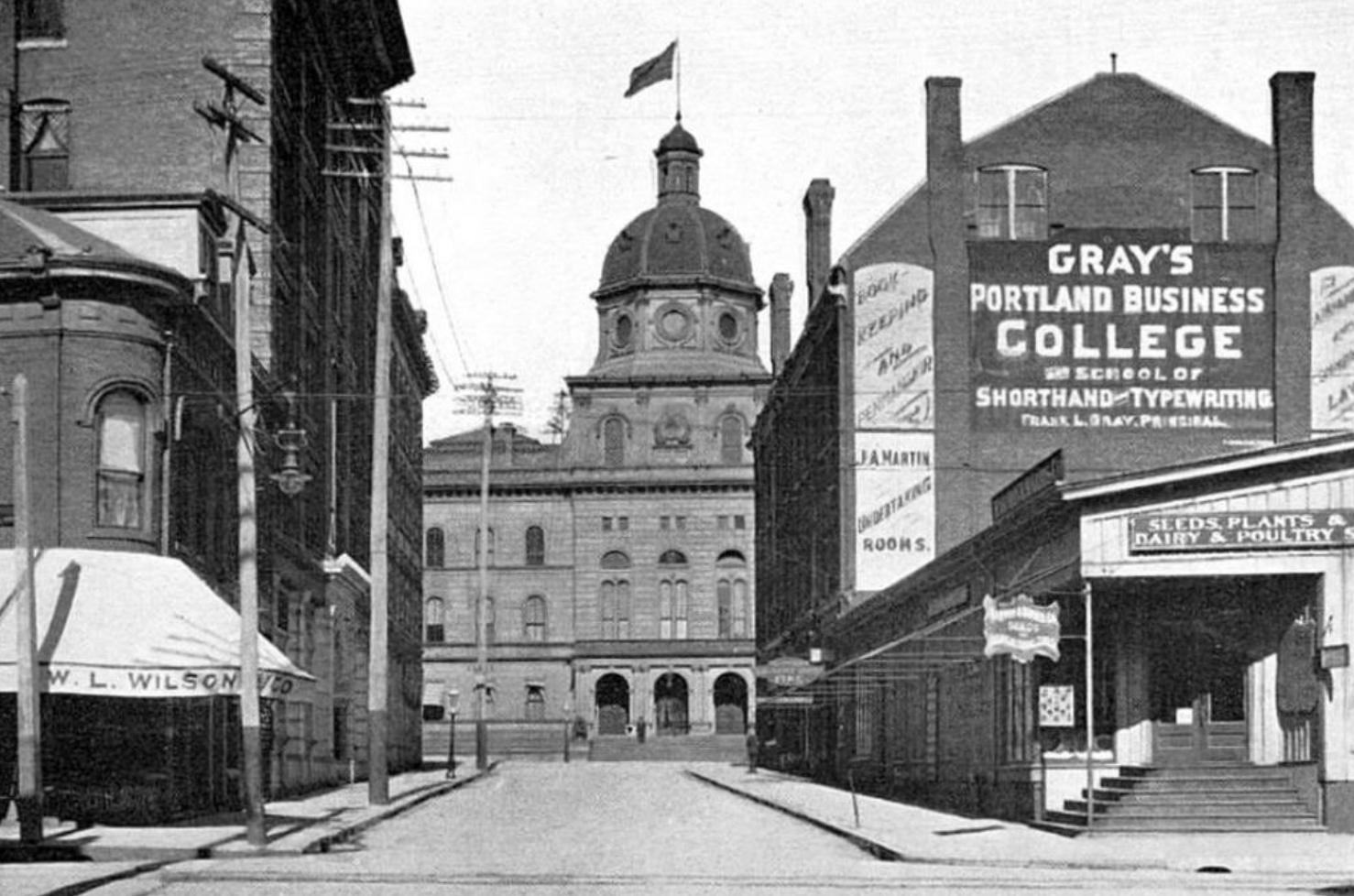
- The upper (northern) end of Exchange Street, which was known as Fish Street at the time this photograph was taken. The third iteration of City Hall is in view
- Interactive map of Exchange Street
- Length: 0.24 mi (0.39 km)
- Location: Portland, Maine, U.S.
- Northwest end: Congress Street
- Southeast end: Fore Street

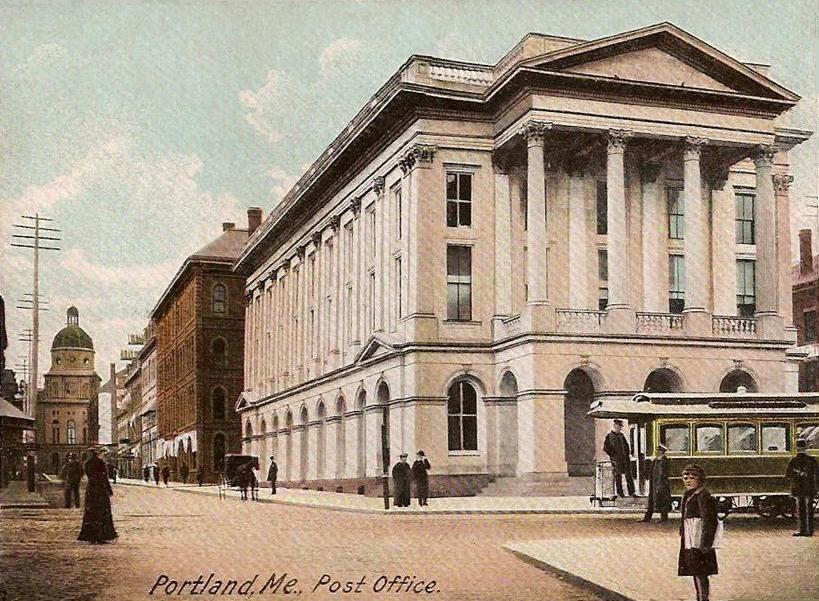
Portland's Old Post Office (now Post Office Park) viewed from Exchange and Middle Street, with a Portland Railroad Company streetcar in view on its route to and from Munjoy Hill (c. 1905)

Exchange Street is a main commercial thoroughfare in the Old Port of Portland, Maine, United States. Originally laid out in 1724, today it features a number of designer clothing stores, as well as several small, locally owned businesses, including Sherman's Maine Coast Books. It runs, one-way, for around 0.24 miles (0.39 km), from Congress Street in the northwest to Fore Street in the southeast. Its main intersections are with (from northwest to southeast) Congress Street, Federal Street, Middle Street and Fore Street.

The Merchant Exchange Building, which formerly stood in Post Office Park between Middle Street, Market Street and Exchange Street, was the home of Atlantic Bank. Completed in 1839, to designs by Boston architect Richard Bond, it was an attempt by local businessmen to return the state government to Portland from Augusta. After being used as a U.S. Custom House into the 1850s, it burned down in 1854. Two more federal buildings stood at the location between 1854 and 1965.

Built 1866, the John Neal Block stands at 16 Exchange Street. John Neal first established his law practice on Exchange Street in 1827, located next door to the law office of Samuel Fessenden.

Before the 1970s, Exchange Street and the Old Port area had become largely run-down and deserted. Gentrification began in the early 1970s and continues to this day.

Historically, Exchange Street was where many printers (such as The Anthoensen Press) and newspapers were located. At the top of Exchange Street, strategically located across Congress Street from Portland City Hall, is the Press Herald Building built in 1923 and expanded in 1948 as the headquarters of the Portland Press Herald. In 2015, the renovated building became the Press Hotel.

Exchange Street was known as Fish Street until around 1810. In 1837, Court Street, which ran between Federal Street and Congress Street, became part of Exchange Street.

Tommy's Park stands at the northwestern corner of Exchange Street's intersection with Middle Street, while Post Office Park is at the northeastern corner.

== Notable buildings ==
- Printers' Exchange Block, intersection of Exchange Street and Federal Street
- Merchants' National Bank, 34 Exchange Street – one of two surviving works of architect Matthew Stead
