= Franklin Street (Portland, Maine) =

Four-lane street in Portland, Maine

Coordinates: 43.662140°N 70.255773°W

- Fiddle Street (formerly); Essex Street (formerly)
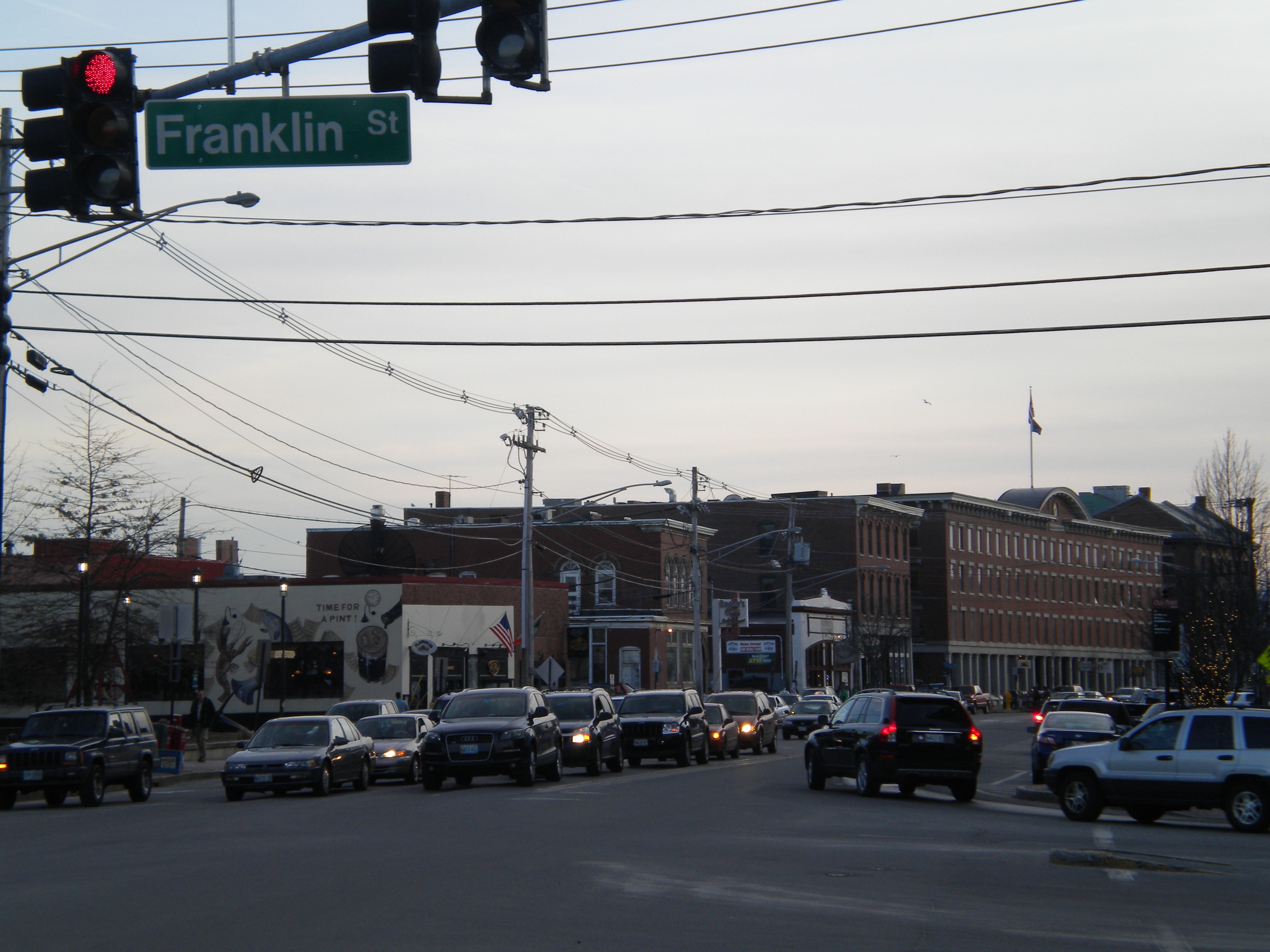
- Franklin Street at Commercial Street
- Interactive map of Franklin Street
- Part of: US 1A
- Length: 0.77 mi (1.24 km)
- Location: Portland, Maine, U.S.
- Northwest end: I-295 & Marginal Way
- Southeast end: Commercial Street & Maine State Pier

Franklin Street is a four-lane street in Portland, Maine, United States. It is a major corridor for traffic from Interstate 295 to Portland's downtown, Old Port, and to other neighborhoods located on the Portland peninsula. Part of U.S. Route 1A, it is around 0.77 miles (1.24 km) long, running between Marginal Way in the northwest and Commercial Street in the southeast.

== History ==
In 1756, when the street was laid out between Middle Street and Back Street (today's Congress Street), it was known as Fiddle Street. It became known as Essex Street later in the 18th century, but changed to Franklin Street by 1823. Franklin Street was rebuilt as a divided arterial roadway in the late 1960s, after the demolition of Portland's Little Italy, Bayside, East Bayside, and other neighborhoods. Renamed Franklin Street Arterial, it was built to allow greater access by nonresident vehicles to Commercial Street and the rest of downtown. This configuration also removed hundreds of housing units, displaced residents, and hindered pedestrian traffic—both along its length and across it—to and from Bayside, East Bayside, the Old Port, Munjoy Hill and other neighborhoods which border it.

=== Redlining ===
In the 1930s, Portland bankers and real estate agents discriminated against Jews, Catholics, immigrants, and other non-WASP residents through the discriminatory practice of redlining. The neighborhoods around Franklin Street were targeted. Redlining caused disinvestment in properties and caused wealthier residents to move. As a result of redlining and the disinvestment it caused, the properties in the targeted neighborhoods fell into decay.

=== Slum clearing ===
In the early 1950s, the newly created Slum Clearance and Redevelopment Authority (SCRA) highlighted Bayside and East Bayside as target neighborhoods due to its high number of immigrants and the decaying buildings caused by redlining. Residents of these neighborhoods resisted the discriminatory campaign. In 1958 the Authority demolished the Little Italy neighborhood, which spanned from the India Street neighborhood to the East Bayside neighborhood, razing 92 dwellings and 27 small businesses. Another 54 dwelling units were razed for the Bayside Park urban renewal project, an area that now includes Fox Field and Kennedy Park public housing. The first phase of the Kennedy Park was built in 1965. Several streets were truncated in an attempt to limit access to outside traffic. The razing of Franklin Street began in 1967; 130 homes and businesses were demolished and an unknown number of families relocated or were displaced. Franklin Street's widening wiped out sections of Lancaster Street, Oxford Street, Federal Street and Newbury Street.

SCRA's Vine-Deer-Chatham project demolished Portland's Little Italy, which was bounded by Franklin Street to the east, Fore Street to the south, Pearl Street to the west and Middle Street to the north. The head of Deer Street was opposite the Thompson Block at 117–125 Middle Street.

=== 21st-century repair efforts ===
In May 2007, seventy people gathered to discuss the impacts and potential of Franklin Street Arterial. In 2009, the report of this meeting was brought to City officials, and helped to set the stage for the Franklin Street Corridor Study: Phase I. Plans have been discussed and presented to change the street, all three of which would add bike paths and sidewalks. In 2010, at the recommendation of the Franklin Street Corridor Study, the name was returned to Franklin Street, by Portland's City Council. New street signs indicating "Franklin Street" were hung in March 2011. Signage on nearby I-295, which the Maine Department of Transportation is responsible for, indicates "Franklin St.," as well. In 2015, the Portland City Council voted to unanimously approve the Franklin Street Master Plan and set forth a plan of multiple phases to redesign the street, reconnect the truncated streets, and slow the traffic traveling on Franklin Street. The city's former manager, Jon Jennings, blocked implementation of the plan. In 2023, two years after Jennings resigned following numerous controversies over his leadership, the effort to redesign the street was revived when the Public Works department added the redesign to its Major Transportation Priorities.

== Nearby landmarks ==
Franklin Towers, at the corner of Franklin Street and Cumberland Avenue, was built at this same time the street was turned into a divided arterial roadway. The Maine State Pier, a deepwater marine facility and outdoor music venue, is located at the intersection of Franklin Street and Commercial Street on Portland's eastern waterfront. Casco Bay Lines, a publicly run transportation company that services the islands of Casco Bay, runs its fleet of five vessels from the Maine State Pier. It is a stop on the Portland Freedom Trail.

== Public transportation ==
Greater Portland Metro's route H (Husky Line) serves Franklin Street. It runs between the University of Southern Maine's Gorham campus and Commercial Street's Ocean Gateway.
