= Old Port of Portland, Maine =

Historic district in Maine, US

Old Port
- District of Portland, Maine
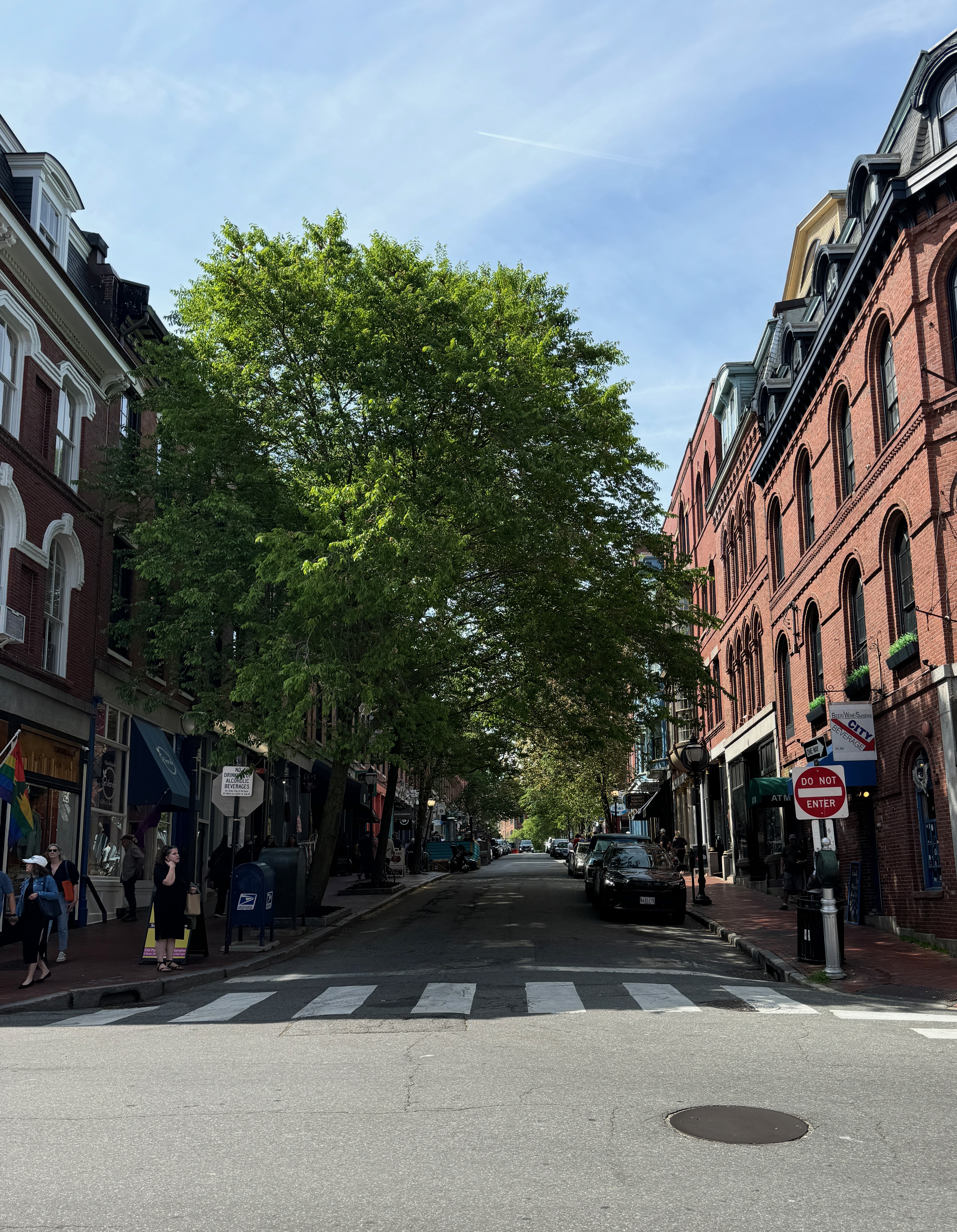
- The foot of Exchange Street, viewed from Fore Street in 2024
- Location in Portland, Maine
- Coordinates: 43.657690°N 70.254658°W
- State: Maine
- County: Cumberland
- City: Portland
- Portland Waterfront Historic District
- U.S. National Register of Historic Places
- U.S. Historic district
- NRHP reference No.: 74000353
- Added to NRHP: May 2, 1974

The Old Port (sometimes known as the Old Port Exchange) is a district of Portland, Maine, known for its cobblestone streets, 19th-century brick buildings and fishing piers. The district contains boutiques, restaurants and bars.

== Geography ==
The Old Port district is located on the southeastern side of the Portland peninsula, overlooking the wide mouth of the Fore River and the Port of Portland. It is bounded on the east by Franklin Street (U.S. Route 1A), with Commercial Street running southwest along the waterfront, and 19th-century buildings on its north side as far west as Maple Street. It extends inland as far as Federal Street, between Pearl and Temple Streets, with Fore and Middle Streets as major cross streets that very roughly parallel the waterfront. The shore area on the southeast side of commercial street is lined with wharves. It is bordered by the neighborhoods of Bayside, East Bayside, Munjoy Hill and the West End.

A large portion of this area has been designated a historic district, and is listed on the National Register of Historic Places as the "Portland Waterfront Historic District".

== Parks ==
The Old Port includes the adjacent parks of Post Office Park and Tommy's Park, which features a large mural. Bell Buoy Park is located next to the Casco Bay Ferry Terminal. The Eastern Promenade Trail terminates in the Old Port and connects to the East End Beach.

=== Post Office Park ===
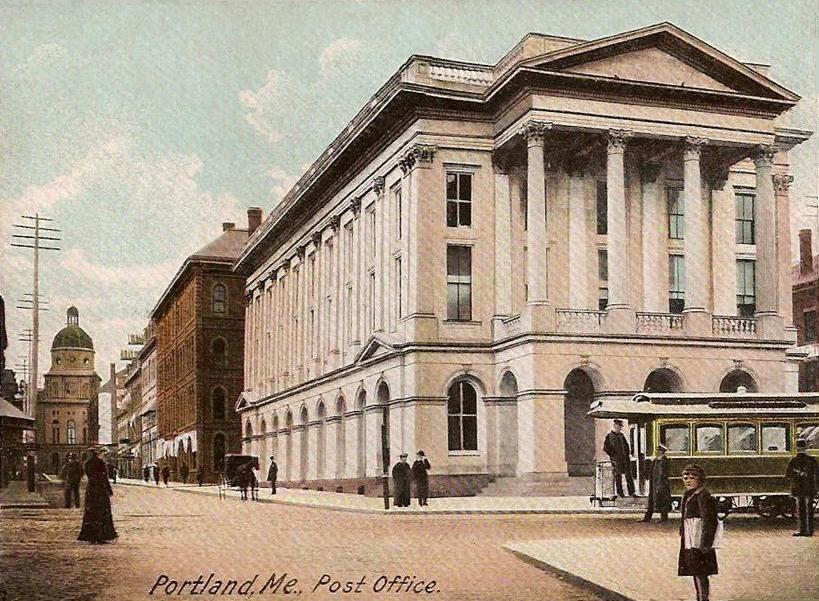
The city's former Post Office formerly occupied today's Post Office Park location. Viewed from Exchange and Middle Street, with a Portland Railroad Company streetcar in view on its route to and from Munjoy Hill (c. 1905)

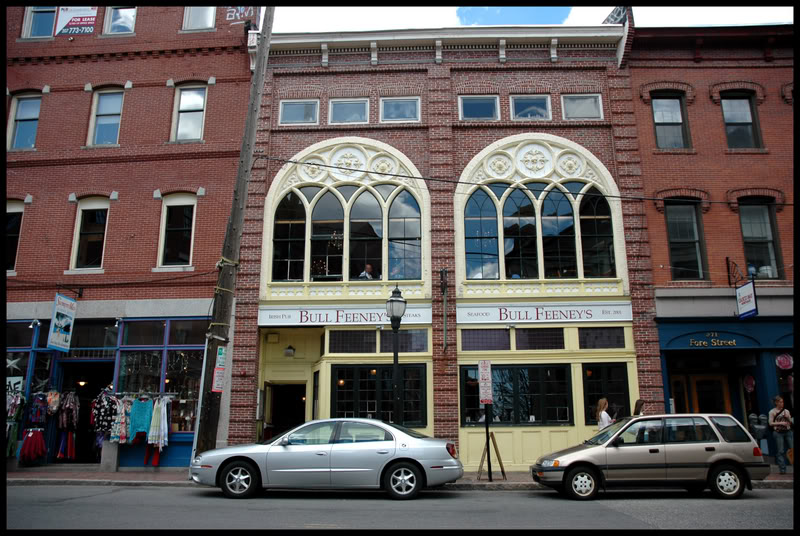
The distinctive glass awning of the former Bull Feeney's, on Fore Street at the head of Moulton Street. Much of the Old Port keeps true to its 19th-century architecture and styling.

Post Office Park is located at the northeastern corner of the intersection of Middle Street and Exchange Street. Its official address is Middle Street. It stands across Exchange Street from the slightly smaller Tommy's Park.

Portland's Post Office, designed by Alfred B. Mullett, stood at the location from 1871 to 1965, when it was demolished and replaced by a parking lot. In the 1980s, the City of Portland considered building a Japanese theme park on the lot, but—due to a recession—it did not come to fruition; instead Post Office Park was built, completed in 1993.

=== Tommy's Park ===
Tommy's Park is located at the northwestern corner of the intersection of Middle Street and Exchange Street. Its official address is Middle Street. It stands across Exchange Street from the slightly larger Post Office Park. The lot was formerly home to a one-storey structure connected to both the Oxford Building at 185 Middle Street and the Jose Block at 80 Exchange Street. A prominent feature of the park was a trompe l'oeil mural painted on the gable end of 80 Exchange Street. The second mural at the location, it was designed and painted in 1986 by local artist Chris Denison. It was removed during building restoration work in 2018, and was repainted to a design by South Portland artist Will Sears. The park contains the city's visitor-information booth.

Between and 1983 and 2021, Mark Gatti operated his Mark's Hot Dogs stand in the park. Tommy's Park is mentioned in The Killing Kind, a 2015 novel by John Connolly.

== History ==
The Portland peninsula was first settled in the 17th century, but was abandoned during the French and Indian Wars of the late 17th and early 18th centuries. It was resettled, and incorporated as Falmouth in 1718. It prospered economically in the 18th century due to the lumber trade, particularly the trade in virgin trees used as ship masts. At the outbreak of the American Revolutionary War, a large part of the city was destroyed by fire in a British raid in October 1775. The city rebuilt, and again became a major shipping center and Maine's leading port and economic center. Commercial Street was created by fill in the 1850s, and Middle and Exchanges Street area developed as a major commercial district. In 1866, a major fire swept through the area, bringing on a wave of new construction.

Historically, Exchange Street was where many printers and newspapers were located. At the top of Exchange Street, strategically located across Congress Street from Portland City Hall, is the Press Herald Building built in 1923 and expanded in 1948 as the headquarters of the Portland Press Herald. In 2015, the renovated building became the Press Hotel.

The Old Port was transformed in the 1970s when real estate developers purchased derelict buildings and refurbished them into apartments, condos, offices and retail space. A new group of restaurants emerged that included The Hollow Reed on Fore Street that are cited for influencing the city's current restaurant culture. During that same decade, the Old Port Association formed and helped halt the city's demolition of historic buildings (see Union Station) and lobbied for streetscape improvements. The Cumberland County Civic Center was built at the top of the Old Port in 1977. In the early 1980s, Congress passed the Economic Recovery Tax Act, which provided tax incentives for redevelopment projects, and spurred further development in the district.

In 2006, construction began on the Ocean Gateway project. The Ocean Gateway serves as the city's cruise ship terminal.

== Old Port Festival ==
The Old Port Festival was a yearly one-day festival which took place in the neighborhood. For the first 36 years (1973–2009), it took place on the first Sunday in June; however, noting weather patterns which consistently brought rain storms on that day, organizers moved the festival to the second Sunday in June 2010, avoiding heavy rain. In 2009, festival organizers sought to create the world's largest lobster roll as part of the festival. It included 48 pounds (22 kg) of lobster meat and 4 gallons of mayonnaise. It measured 61 feet and 9.5 inches long. Pieces of the roll were sold to benefit a youth association. In 1998, the event included children games, including a petting zoo and miniature golf. In June 2019, the final Old Port Festival occurred, though some area business owners sought to continue the event.

== See also ==
- National Register of Historic Places listings in Portland, Maine
- Wharves of Portland, Maine
