= 1866 great fire of Portland, Maine =

Conflagration in Portland, Maine, United States

1866 great fire of Portland
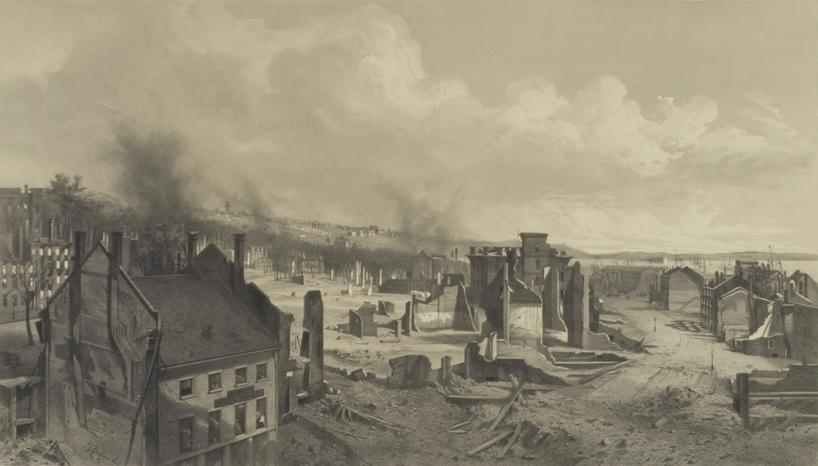
- Ruins of the Great Fire at Portland, Me. an artist's rendering by J. E. Baker
- Date: July 4–5, 1866
- Location: Portland, Maine, United States
- Coordinates: 43°39′5″N 70°15′25″W

Impacts
- Deaths: 4
- Structures destroyed: 1,800

Ignition
- Cause: Accidental

The 1866 great fire of Portland (Note: The event is also known by similar names with varying capitalization, such as Portland's Great Fire of 1866.) spread throughout the city of Portland, Maine, on July 4, 1866—the second Independence Day after the end of the American Civil War. The fire burned out the morning of July 5; while over a thousand buildings were destroyed, there were few fatalities. Occurring five years before the Great Chicago Fire, it was the greatest fire yet seen in an American city.

== Description ==
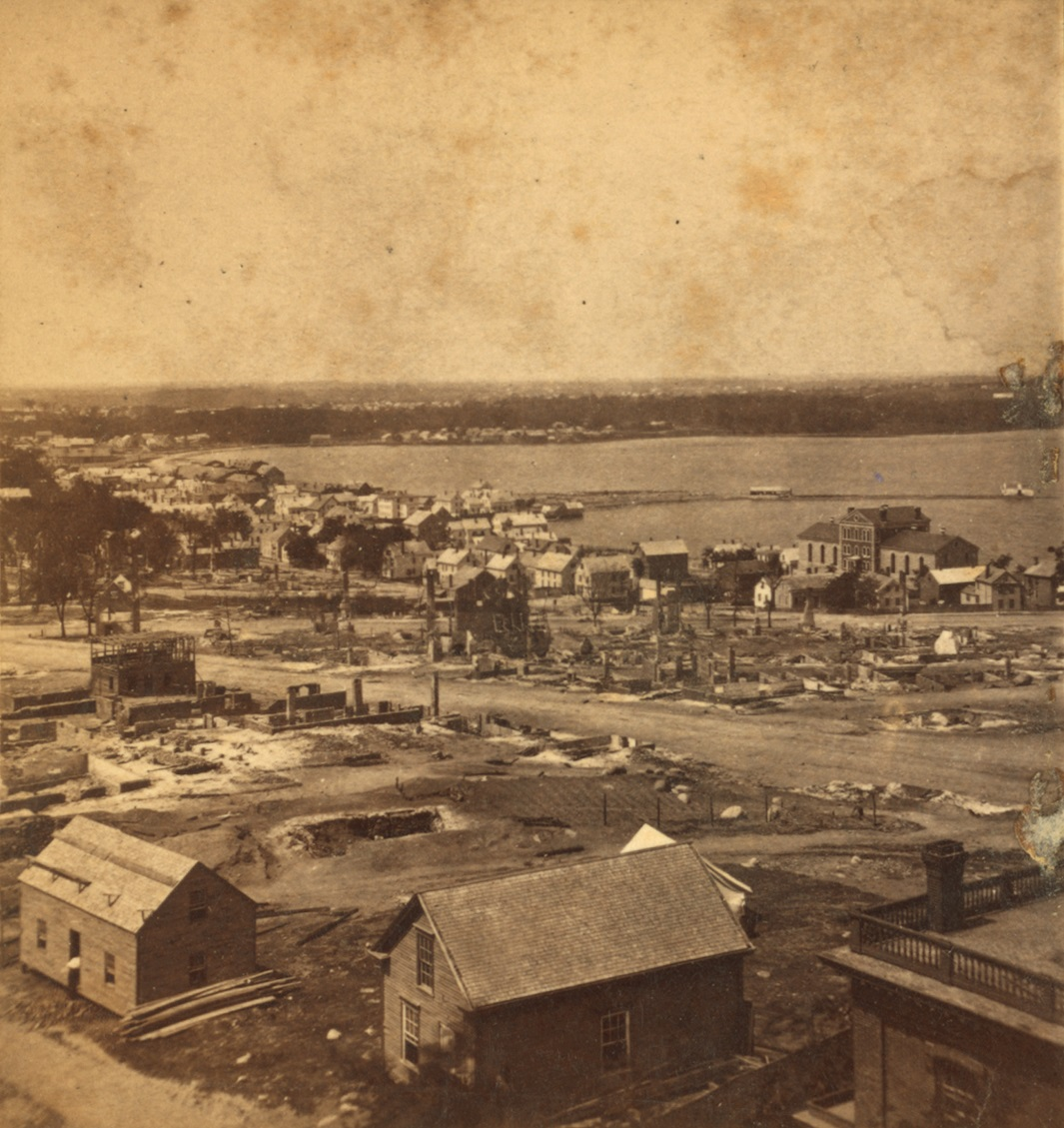
Looking west from Portland Observatory

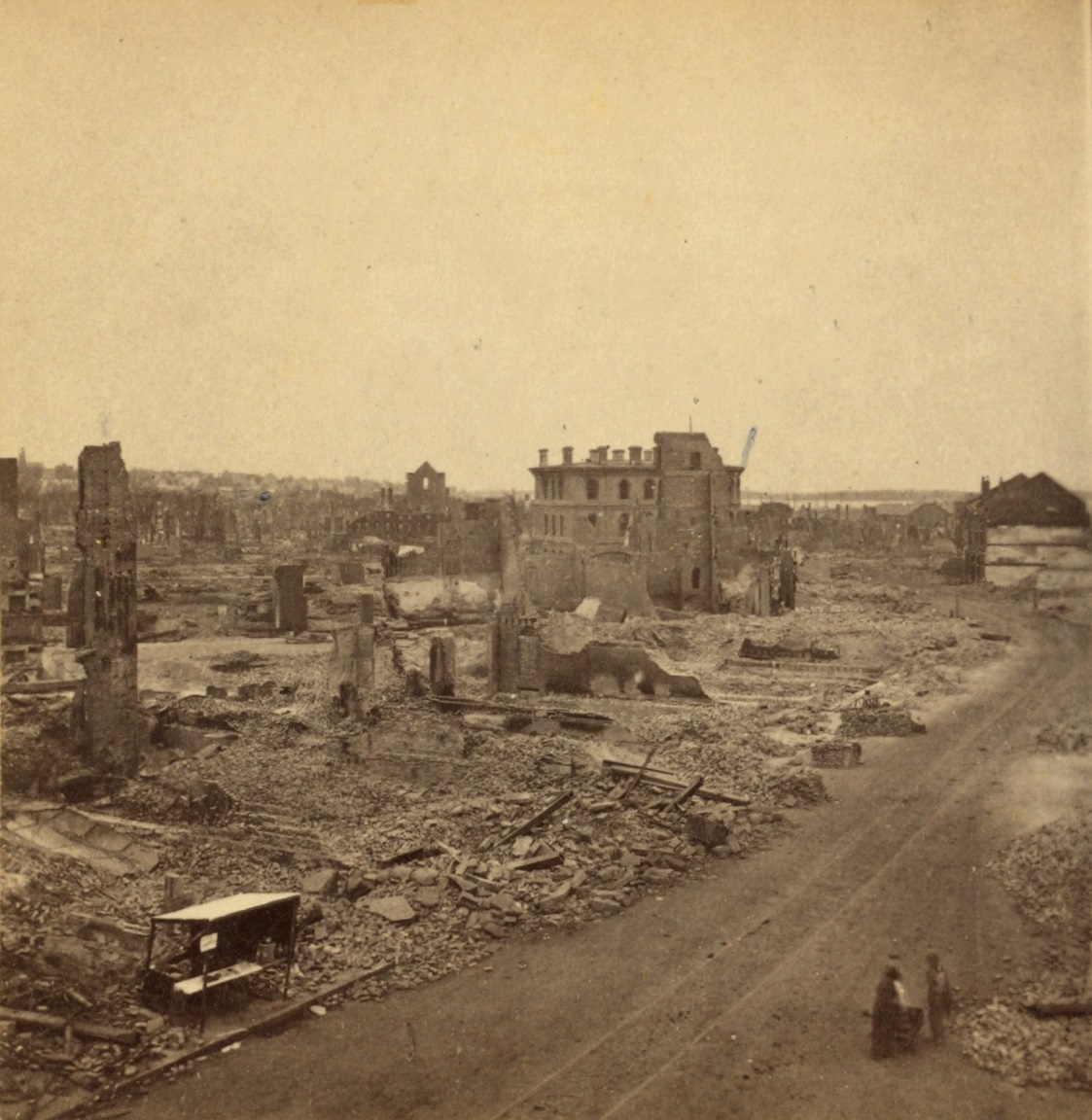
Looking down Middle Street

The fire started in a boat house near today's Hobson's Wharf on Commercial Street, likely caused by a firecracker or a cigar ash. The fire spread to a lumber yard and on to a sugar house, then spread across the city, eventually burning out early the next morning on Munjoy Hill in the city's east end.

Four people died in the fire and 10,000 people were made homeless. Around 1,800 buildings (1,200 homes) were burned to the ground, including the first of three city halls which have stood at the present Congress Street location. Also lost was the federal Exchange Building, which was replaced with the custom house.

Soon after the fire, Portland native and acclaimed poet Henry Wadsworth Longfellow described his old home town: "Desolation, desolation, desolation. It reminded me of Pompeii, that 'sepult city.'" (Note: "sepult" is an archaic adjective meaning "buried") More than 600 buildings were constructed in the four months following the fire.
