= Holyoke Wharf =

Historic wharf in Portland, Maine

- Dyer's Wharf (former name)
- Interactive map of Holyoke Wharf
- Location: Commercial Street, Portland, Maine, U.S.
- Coordinates: 43°38′59″N 70°15′24″W

Holyoke Wharf (formerly Dyer's Wharf) is a historic wharf in Portland, Maine, on the edge of the Fore River. It is located on Commercial Street between Berlin Mills Wharf (to the north) and Sturdivant's Wharf (to the south).

At the head of the wharf formerly stood New England Cabinet Works, which was established in 1910 by Charles A. Hallen. It was originally named Johnson-Hallen Company.

Gilbert Mills Soule, a lumber merchant, owned the wharf in the late 19th century. It later came under the ownership of the proprietors of Portland Pier at the other end of Commercial Street.
