= E. Swasey & Company =

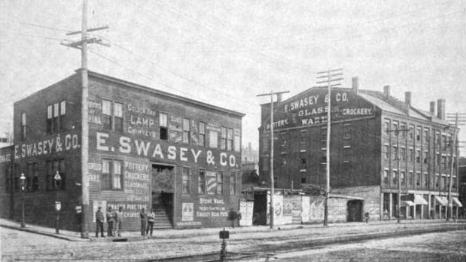
- A view of the Commercial Street buildings around 1910. The structure on the left has since been demolished and replaced
- Company type: Textile manufacturing
- Founded: 1890
- Founder: Eben Swasey
- Headquarters: Portland, Maine, United States
- Number of locations: 2
- Key people: Eben Swasey; Fred D. Swasey; George Young.

E. Swasey & Company was a prominent textile firm based in Portland, Maine, United States, in the late 19th and early 20th centuries. It also had a branch on Summer Street in Boston, Massachusetts.

The company was run by Eben Swasey (1843–1906), his son Fred D. Swasey (1869–1931) and George Young. It produced pottery, crockery and glassware for wholesale, while also importing pottery.

Eben Swasey began producing earthenware at his brick warehouse on Portland's Commercial Street in 1890. He had previously run Portland Earthenware Manufactory with Rufus Lamson. Swasey's products are now collector's items.

One of the two adjacent buildings Swasey worked out of on Commercial Street is still standing and occupied; the other was demolished and is now a boutique hotel and rooftop bar.

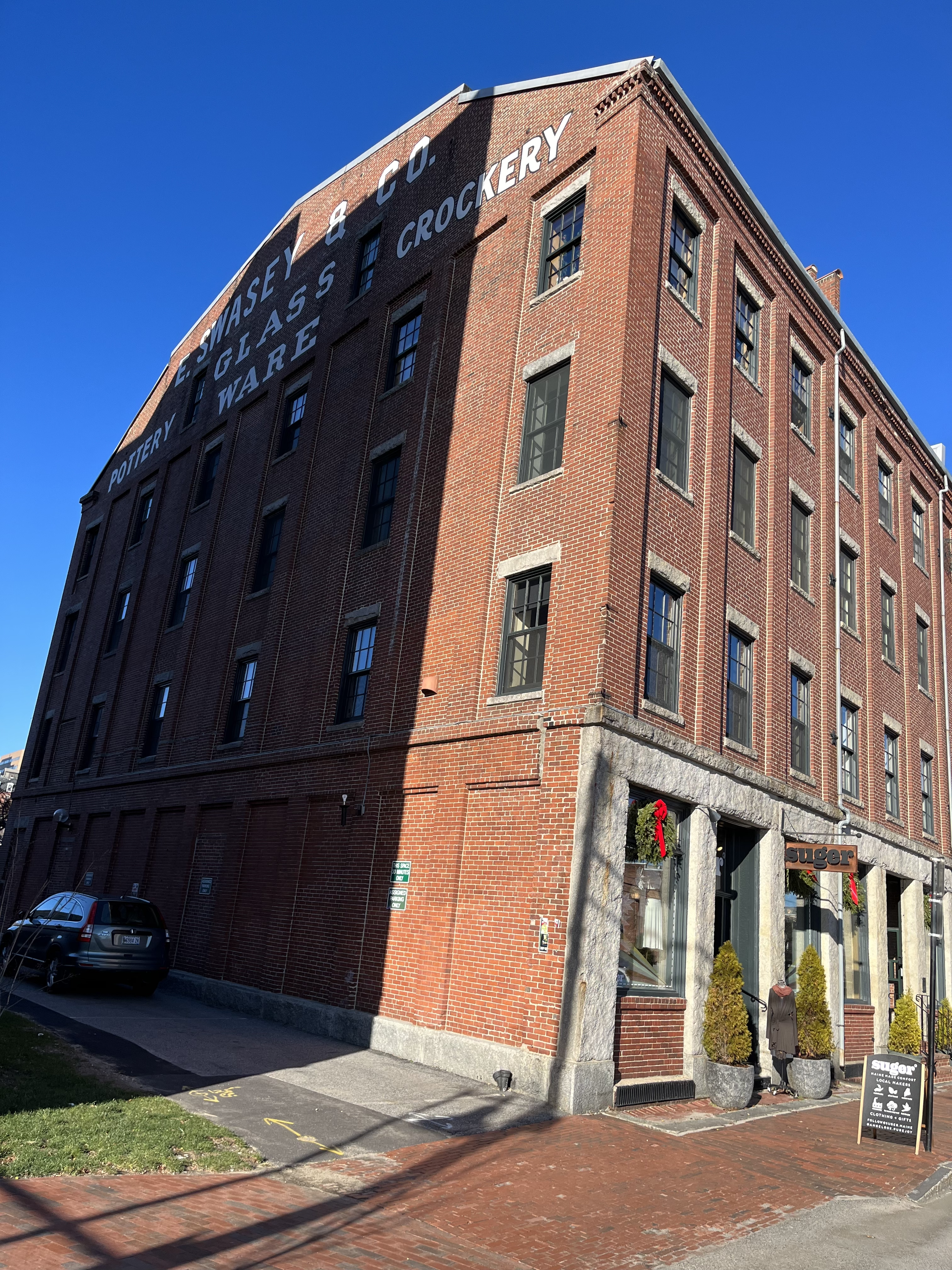
The main building (2022)

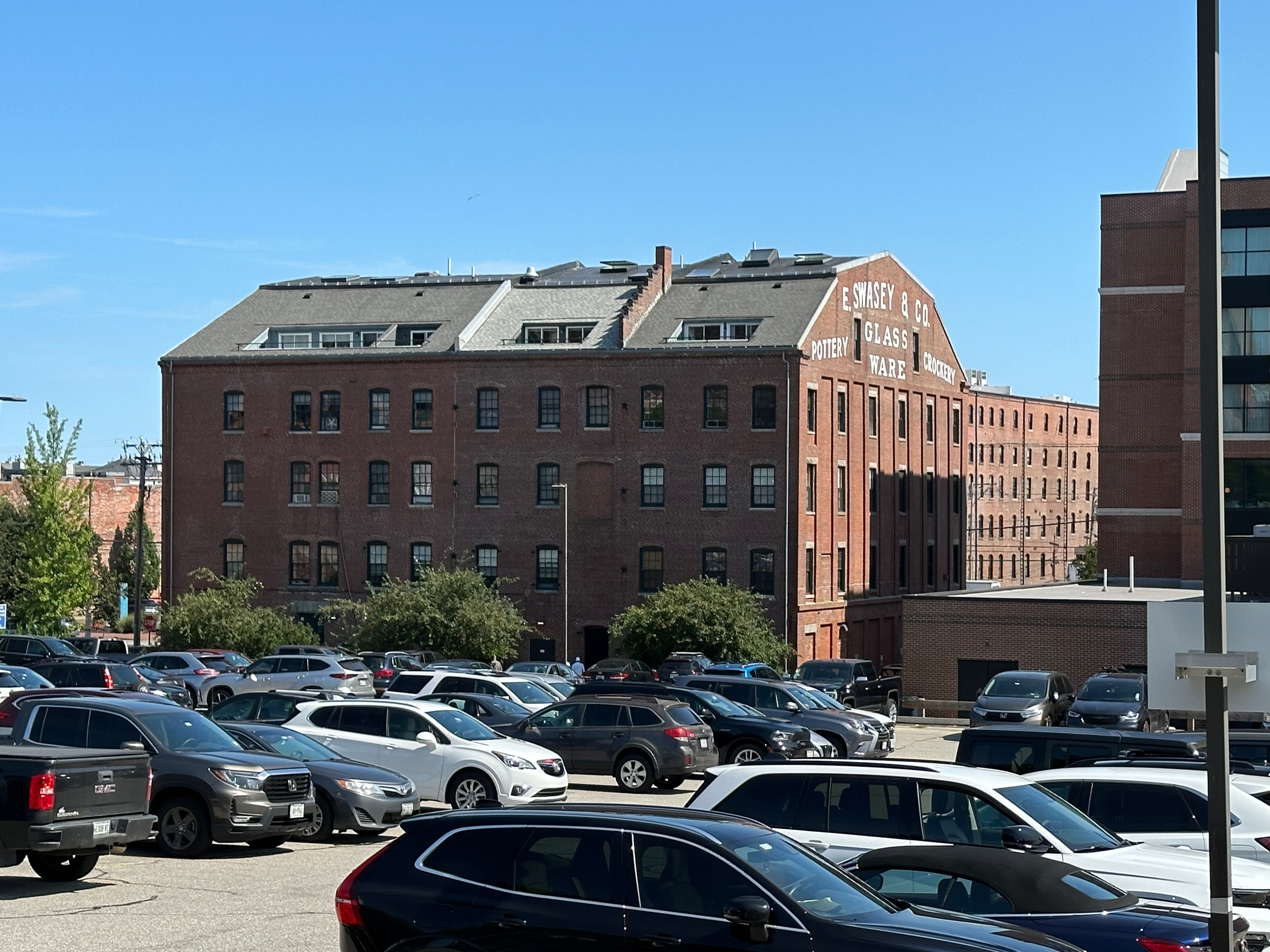
The rear of the building, viewed from Fore Street
