= Berlin Mills Wharf =

Wharf in Portland, Maine, United States

Coordinates: 43°39′00″N 70°15′23″W

- Location: Commercial Street, Portland, Maine, U.S.

Berlin Mills Wharf is a historic wharf in Portland, Maine, on the edge of the Fore River. It is located on Commercial Street between Hobson's Wharf (to the north) and Holyoke Wharf (to the south). It is located across Commercial Street from High Street.

Berlin Mills Company (started as H. Winslow & Company in 1852) was a lumber company with a planing mill.

The wharf was purchased in 2019 by Christopher DiMillo.
