= Harding Lee Smith =

American restaurateur

- Born: Brunswick, Maine, U.S.
- Education: Boston University
- Spouse: Sarah Smith
- Children: 2
- Culinary career
- Current restaurants: The Front Room (since 2005); The Grill Room (since 2008); The Corner Room (since 2009); The Mountain Room (since 2017); The Last Run Room (since 2023); The Annex (since 2024)

Harding Lee Smith is an American restaurateur from Portland, Maine. He owns three restaurants in Portland—The Front Room, The Corner Room and The Grill Room―collectively known as "the Rooms". He also owns The Mountain Room and The Last Run Room, both of which are at Sunday River Ski Resort. The Annex, adjoining The Grill Room, is his most recent venture.

== Early life ==
Smith was born in Brunswick, Maine, and grew up in West Bath. He attended Deering High School in Portland, Maine. He went on to study hotel management at Boston University and took classes at the The Culinary Institute of America at Greystone in St. Helena, California. After working at restaurants in Boston, California, Hawaii and Italy, he returned to Portland around 2003.

== Career ==
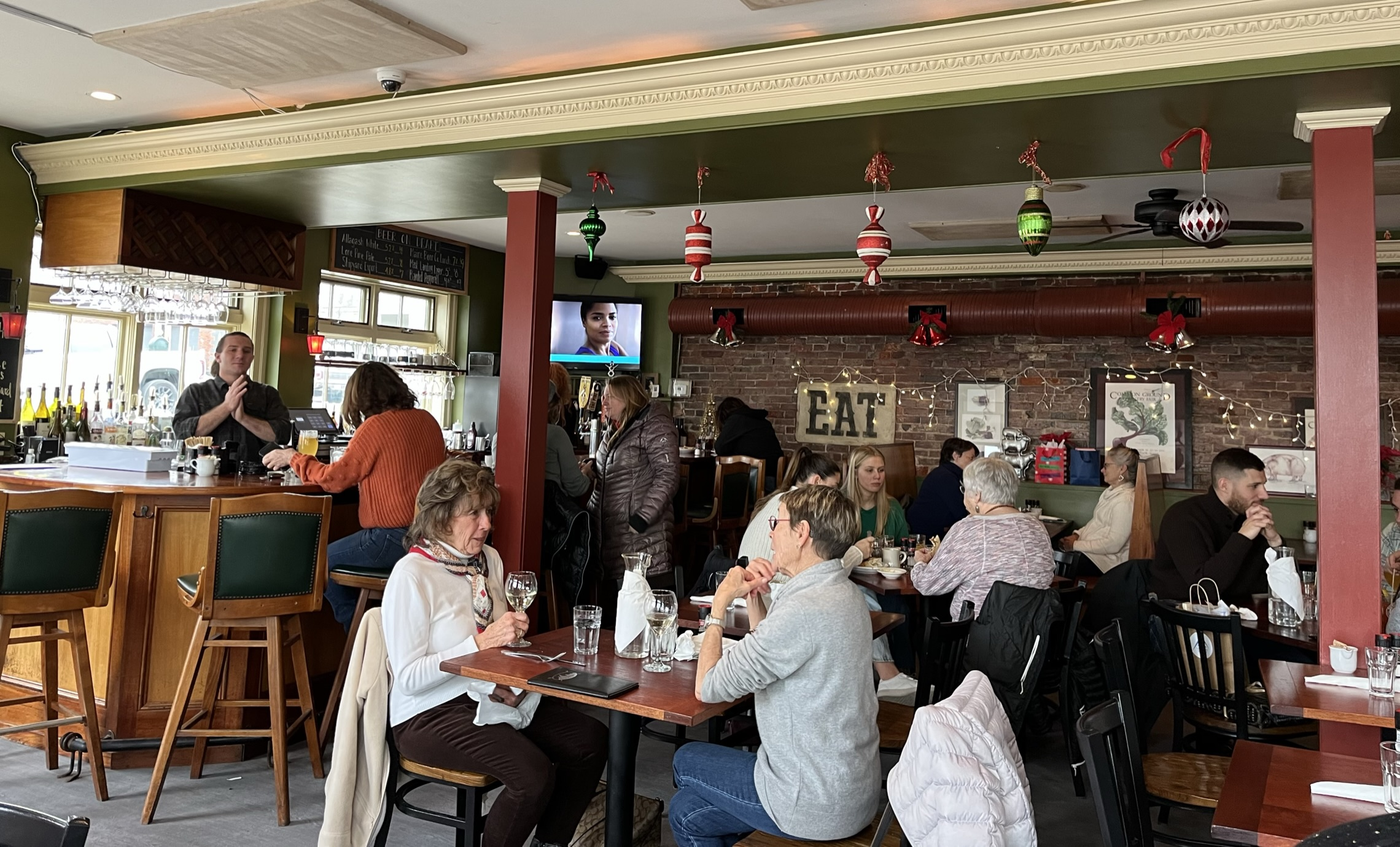
The Front Room, on Munjoy Hill, opened in 2005

Smith worked at Mims Brasserie in Portland before becoming sous-chef at Back Bay Grill.

Smith opened The Front Room, on Munjoy Hill in Portland, in December 2005. He followed this in May 2008 with The Grill Room, on Exchange Street, becoming the first chef to open multiple independent restaurants in the city. In 2009, he opened The Corner Room, a few doors further north on Exchange Street.

In 2017, he expanded his enterprise to Sunday River Ski Resort, in Newry, Maine, where he opened The Mountain Room in 2017 and, in 2023, The Last Run Room.

The Annex, a function space adjoining The Grill Room, is Smith's most recent venture, opening in 2024.

== Personal life ==
Smith married Darcy Paige Smith in 2011, but they separated in 2014 and divorced in 2016. They had a daughter in 2008 and a son in 2013. The couple opened Portland's Boone's Fish House & Oyster Room, on Custom House Wharf, together in 2013. Harding sued Darcy in 2023, claiming she owed him $150,000.

In 2010, several of the Smiths' employees sued the couple over wages and working conditions.

In February 2013, Smith fell into the waters of Casco Bay, beside DiMillo's Floating Restaurant, during a blizzard. He was hospitalized with hypothermia.

He married his second wife, Sarah, in 2017. She is the co-owner of The Mountain Room. As of 2025, they live in North Yarmouth, Maine.
