= Harbor Fish Market =

Fish market in Portland, Maine

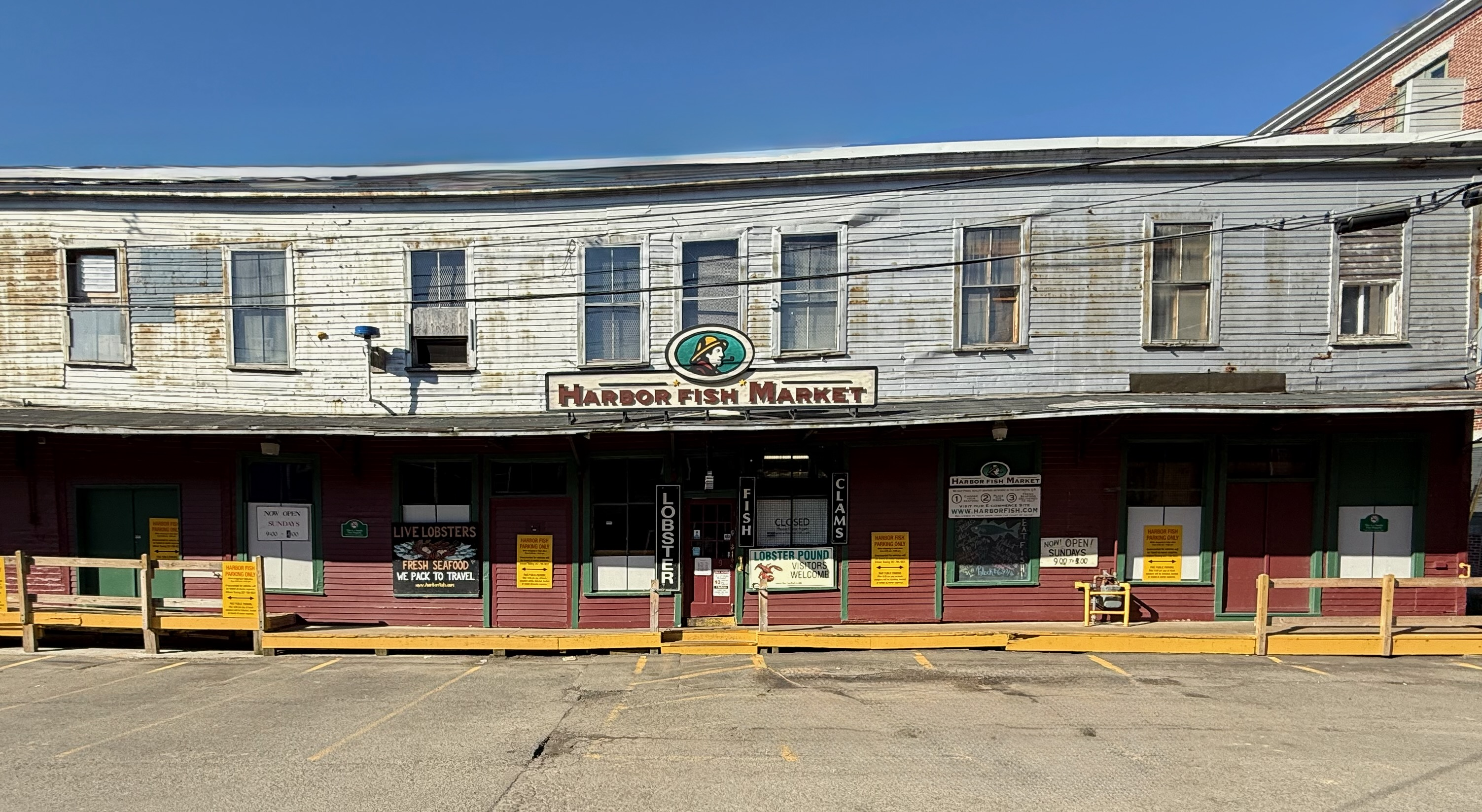
- Frontage in 2025
- Founded: c. 1890 (as Harbor Fish Market since 1966)
- Founder: Ben Alfiero Sr. John Alfiero (as Harbor Fish Market)
- Headquarters: Portland, Maine, United States
- Number of locations: 2
- Products: Seafood
- Owners: Ben Alfiero Jr. Mike Alfiero; Nick Alfiero
- Website: www.harborfish.com

Harbor Fish Market is a prominent and historic fish market in the Old Port of Portland, Maine, United States. It was established in the late 19th century in the city's working waterfront, and is still doing business out of its original home at 9 Custom House Wharf, which was owned by the same family between circa 1807 and 2022. It is popular with both locals and tourists. In the 1990s, their store frontage appeared in photographs so often that the family trademarked the image.

The business was given its current name in 1966, when Ben Alfiero Sr. and his older brother John purchased the business. Ben became the sole owner in 1975, later assisted by his sons Nick, Ben Jr. and Mike. Ben Sr. retired in 2000.

As the business continued to grow, a larger processing plant was opened on Commercial Street. A second retail location, in North Deering, was opened around the same time.

When fishing restrictions were introduced in the late 1980s, Harbor Fish closed its processing plant and moved it back to its newly expanded Custom House Wharf location. The original store was just over twenty feet wide.

The company opened a second location in March 2022, located on U.S. Route 1 in Scarborough, Maine, in a space shared with Rosemont Market.

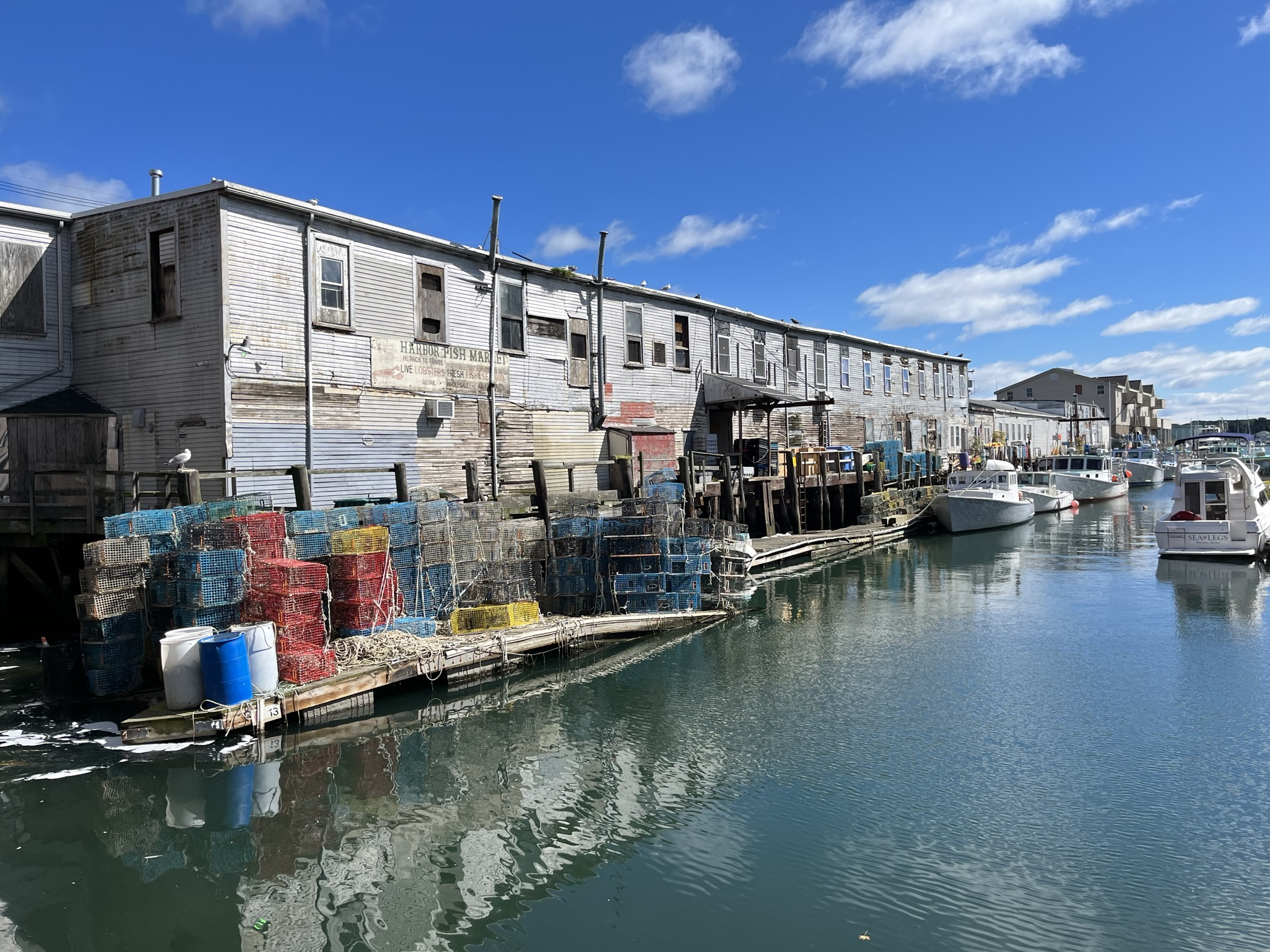
The rear of the business

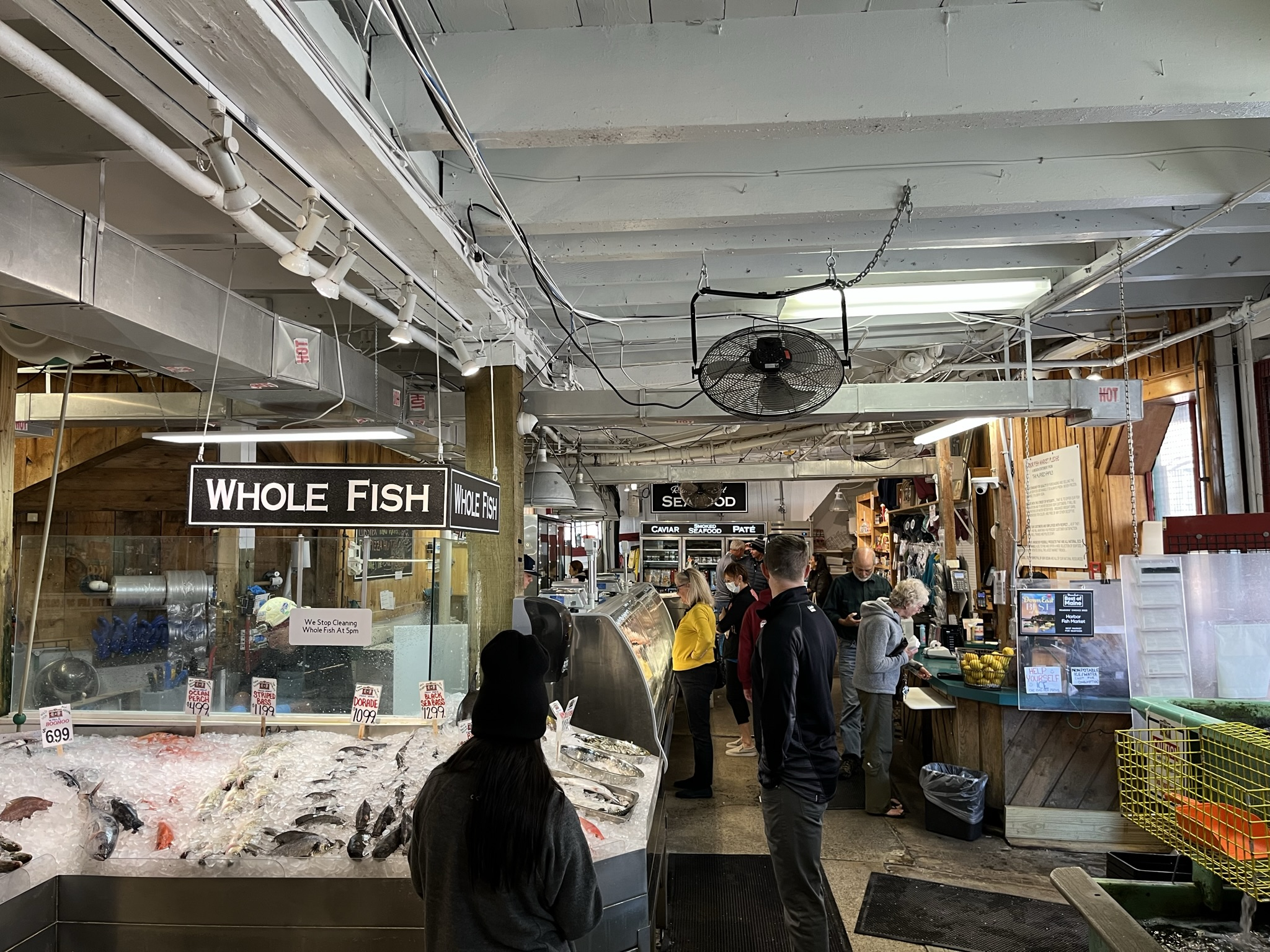
The interior (2022)

== Notable patrons ==
Julia Child, Billy Joel and Mainer native Patrick Dempsey have all visited the store.

== Publications ==
- Harbor Fish Market (Nick Alfiero, Down East Books, 2013) ISBN 1608932451
