= Hobson's Wharf =

Wharf in Portland, Maine, United States

- Sawyer's Wharf (formerly)
- Interactive map of Hobson's Wharf
- Location: Commercial Street, Portland, Maine, U.S.
- Coordinates: 43°39′02″N 70°15′23″W

Hobson's Wharf (formerly known as Sawyer's Wharf) is a historic wharf in Portland, Maine, on the edge of the Fore River. It is located on Commercial Street between Wright Wharf (to the north) and Berlin Mills Wharf (to the south). It is located across Commercial Street from High Street.

Becky's Diner has stood at the head of the wharf since its establishment in 1991.
