= Chinatown, Portland =

Chinatown, Portland may refer to:

- Old Town Chinatown, Portland, Oregon
- Chinatown, Portland, Maine
