= Portland Fish Pier =

Fishing pier

Coordinates: 43°39′05″N 70°15′14″W

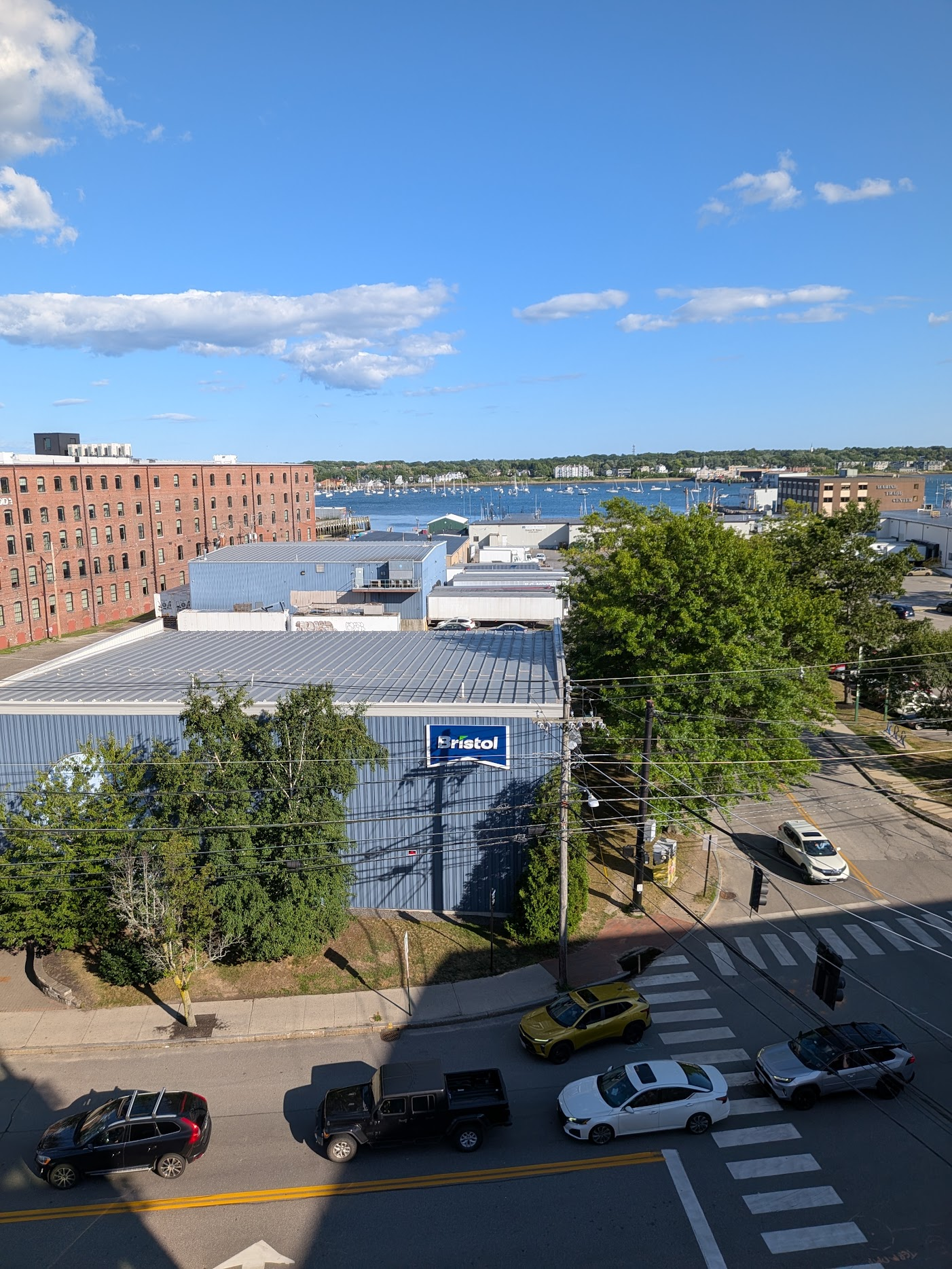
- Pictured in 2026
- Interactive map of Portland Fish Pier
- Location: Commercial Street, Portland, Maine, U.S.

The Portland Fish Pier is a fishing pier located in Portland, Maine, on the edge of the Fore River. It is a major hub for the commercial fishing industry, and is home to the Portland Fish Exchange, where over 20 million pounds (9.1 kt) of seafood a year are bought and sold. A fishermen's memorial is also located at the pier.

Due to the heavy commercial fishing industry presence, there is no ferry service at the Portland Fish Pier. Instead, the Casco Bay Ferry arrives and departs from the nearby Maine State Pier.

The pier stands across Commercial Street from Center Street and, on the waterfront side, between Merrill's Wharf (to the north) and Wright Wharf (to the south).

The creation of the pier required the demolition of three wharves: Richardson's, Brown's and Smith's. (Brown's Wharf is preserved in the name of the southernmost of the two entrances to the pier, opposite Maple Street.)
