= 2024 Portland, Maine flood =

2024 disaster in Portland, Maine

2024 Portland flood
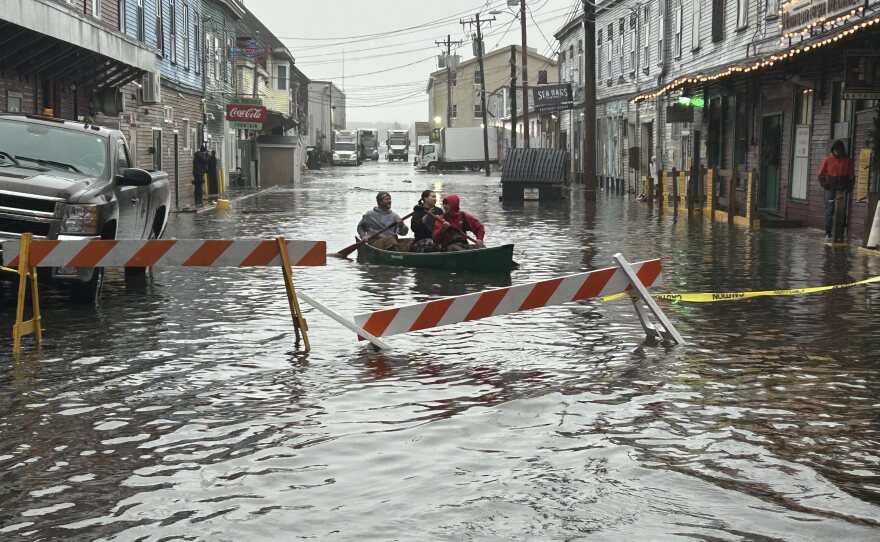
- A flooded Custom House Wharf
- Date: 13 January 2024 (2 years ago)
- Location: Portland, Maine, U.S.

The 2024 Portland flood was caused by heavy rainfall, an astronomical high tide, and high winds in Portland, Maine. It occurred, across coastal central Maine, on January 13, 2024, causing severe flooding, especially in Portland's Old Port district and around Back Cove. The storm followed another one, three days earlier, which also occurred during high tide.

== Flood measurements ==
During the storm, 2.9 inches (74 mm) of rain fell during the morning, and 60-mile-per-hour (97 km/h) winds, combined with a record-breaking high tide, resulted in waves of 15 feet (4.6 m) to 20 feet (6.1 m). At mean lower low water (MLLW), a record-high tide level of 14.57 feet (4.44 m) was measured, surpassing the previous high of 14.17 feet (4.32 m) from 1978.

== Properties impacted ==
Portland Pier was submerged, by water from the Fore River, which is a regular occurrence for that pier. The pier floods with any tide 12 feet (3.7 m) or higher.

Water also breached Commercial Street at Chandler's Wharf, and Maine State Pier, which was completely submerged.

DiMillo's Floating Restaurant suffered damage to its pilings, hinges broke off a platform, and the buildings on its pier flooded.

The deck of Becky's Diner was flooded, and flood waters surrounded the restaurant's building on two sides.
