= Wright Wharf =

Wharf in Portland, Maine, United States

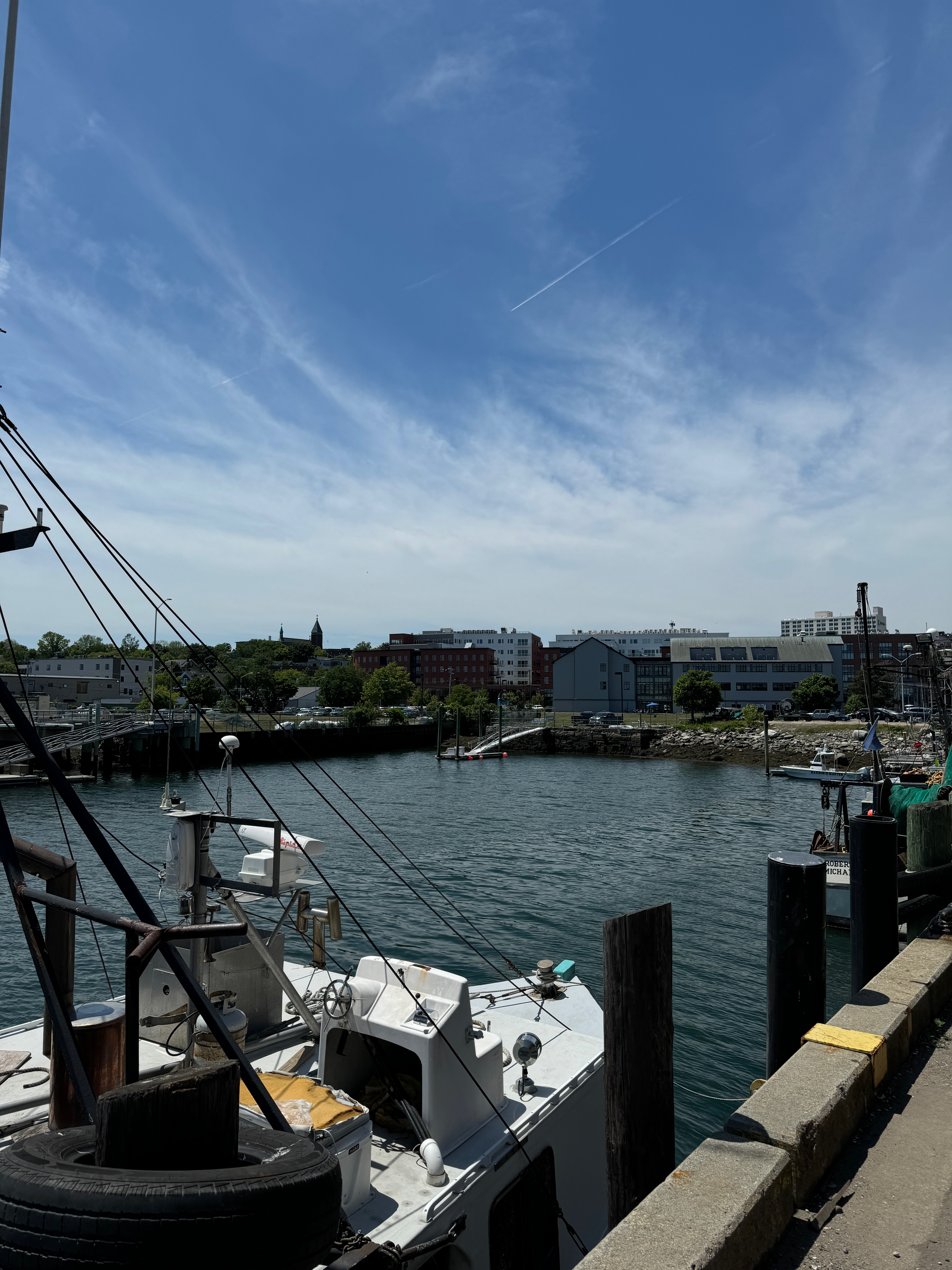
- Looking south to Wright Wharf from Portland Fish Pier in 2024
- Interactive map of Wright Wharf
- Location: Commercial Street, Portland, Maine, U.S.
- Coordinates: 43.6506°N 70.2552°W

Wright Wharf (or Wright's Wharf) is a historic wharf in Portland, Maine, on the edge of the Fore River. It is located on Commercial Street between Portland Fish Pier (to the north) and Hobson's Wharf (to the south). Brown's Wharf formerly stood to the north, where the parking lot for Portland Fish Pier is today.

The wharf is named for A. R. Wright, who owned a coal works on it in the early 20th century. The wharf is owned by the Gulf of Maine Research Institute.
