= Merrill's Wharf =

Historic wharf in Portland, Maine, U.S.

Coordinates: 43°39′13″N 70°15′15″W

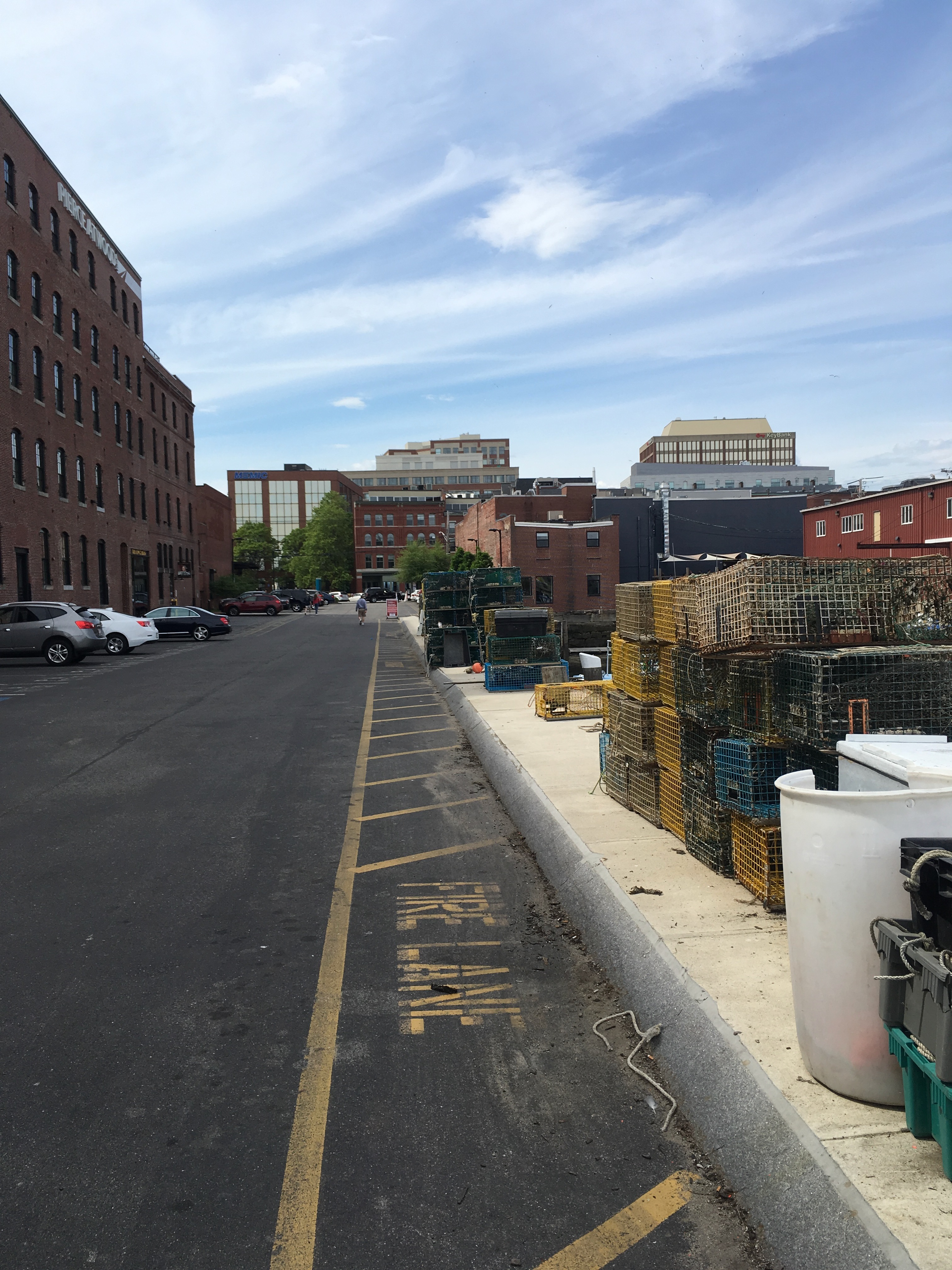
- Looking back to Commercial Street in 2016
- Former name: Dana's Wharf
- Location: Commercial Street, Portland, Maine, U.S.

Merrill's Wharf is a historic wharf in Portland, Maine, on the edge of the Fore River. It stands across Commercial Street from Cross Street and, on the waterfront side, between Union Wharf (to the north) and Portland Fish Pier (to the south). It was formerly known as Dana's Wharf.

Today, the wharf is home to businesses (including Pierce Atwood), which occupy a former brick warehouse known as the Twitchell–Chaplin Grocery Company Building.

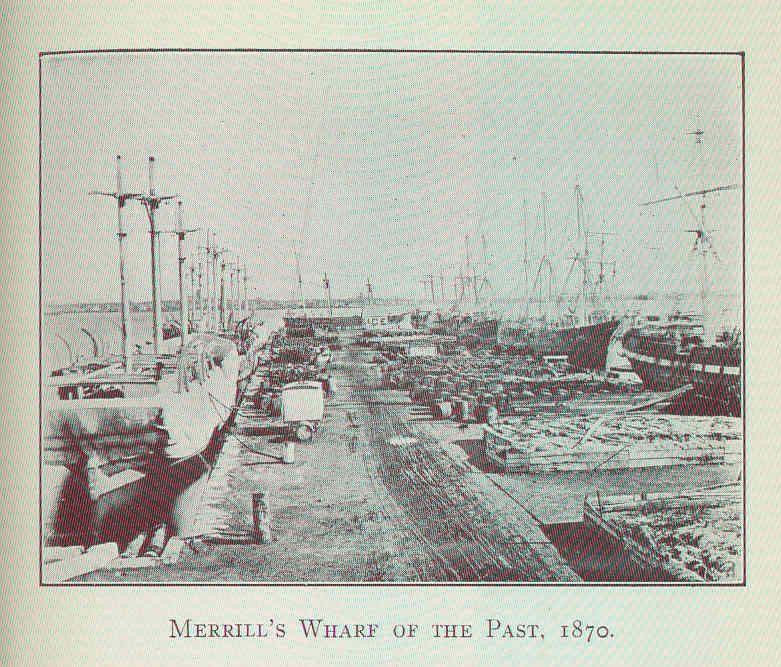
An 1870 postcard showing Merrill's Wharf as it appeared at the time.

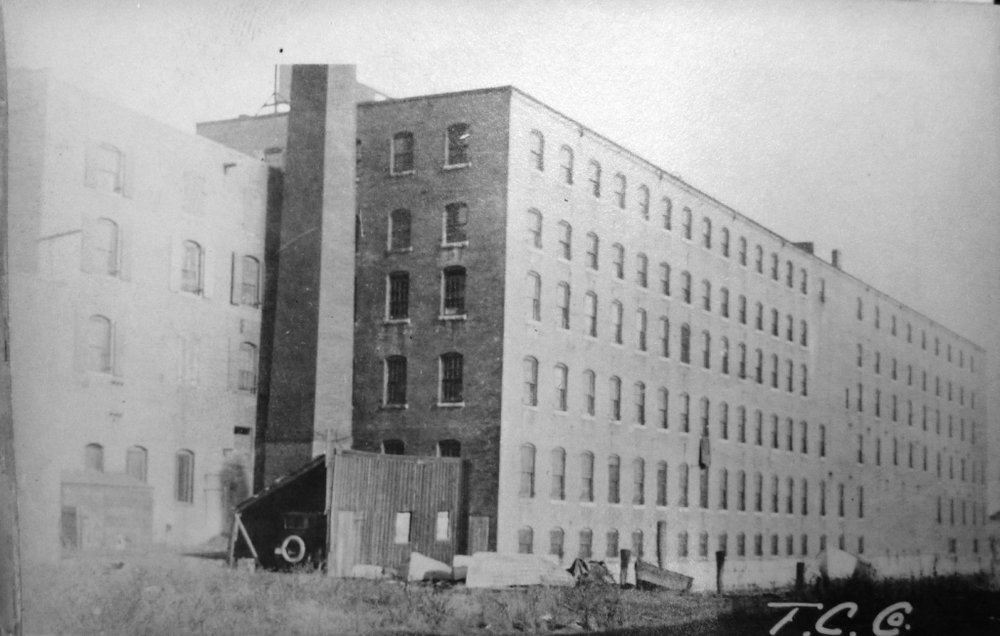
Merrill's Wharf as it appeared at an unknown point in the past that must have been prior to at least 1960, at which point the windows were blocked to convert the building to cold storage.

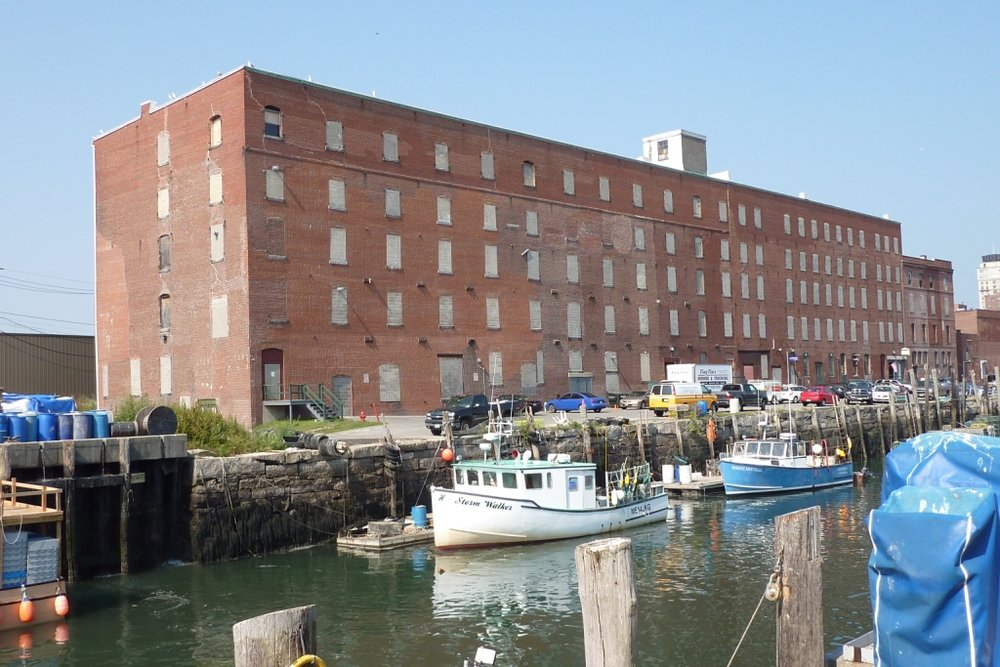
The primary building at Merrill's Wharf as it appears today.
