= Sturdivant's Wharf =

Wharf in Portland, Maine, United States

Coordinates: 43°38′57″N 70°15′25″W

- Robinson's Wharf (former name)
- Location: Commercial Street, Portland, Maine, U.S.

Sturdivant's Wharf (formerly Robinson's Wharf) is a historic wharf in Portland, Maine, on the edge of the Fore River. It is located on Commercial Street between Holyoke Wharf (to the north) and Deake's Wharf (to the south). It stands across Commercial Street from Park Street.
