= Maine Wharf =

Historic wharf in Portland, Maine, U.S.

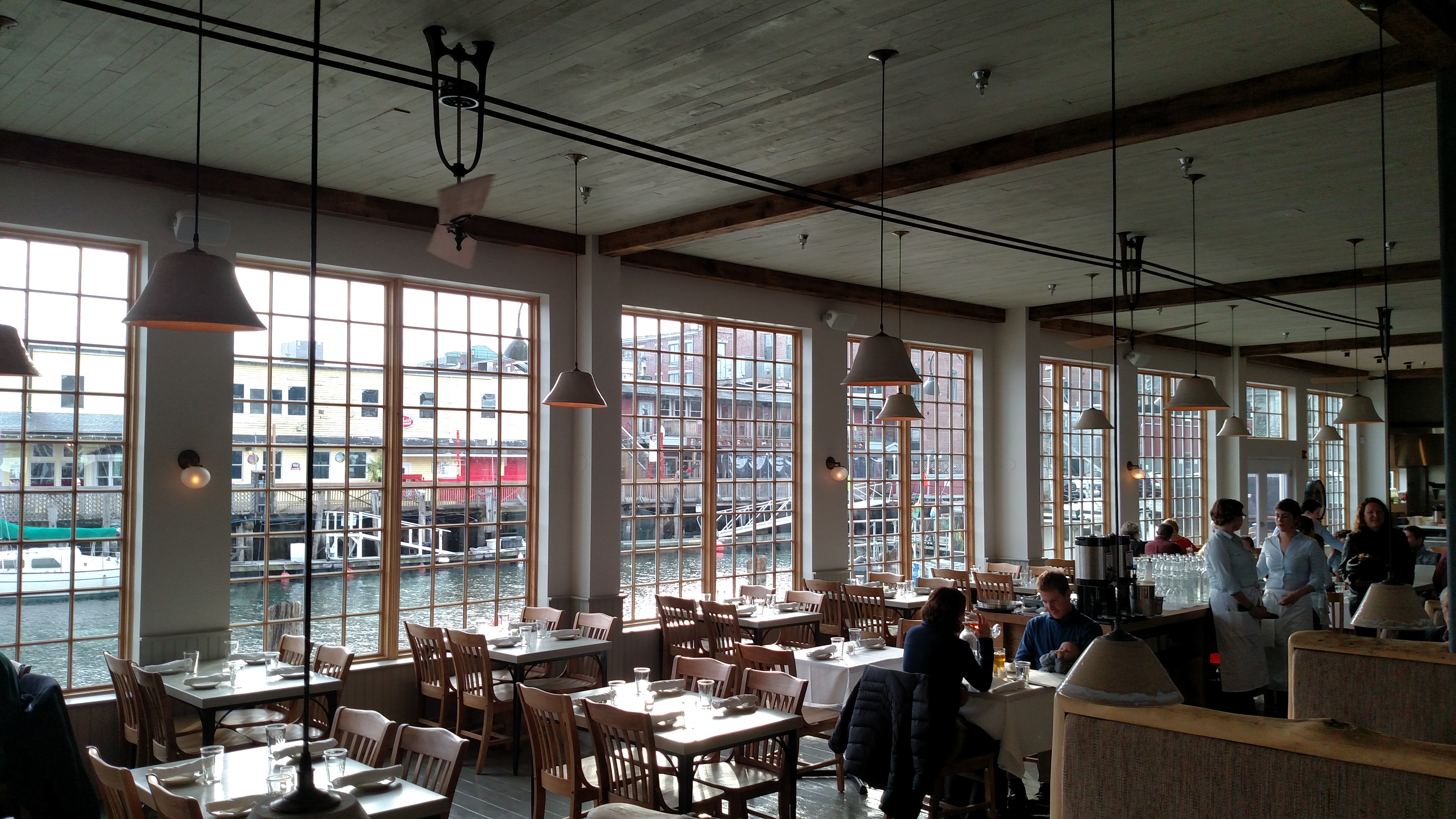
- From inside Scales restaurant, views are had of Maine State Pier (in this image) to the north and Custom House Wharf to the south
- Interactive map of Maine Wharf
- Location: Commercial Street, Portland, Maine, U.S.
- Coordinates: 43.65662°N 70.24927°W

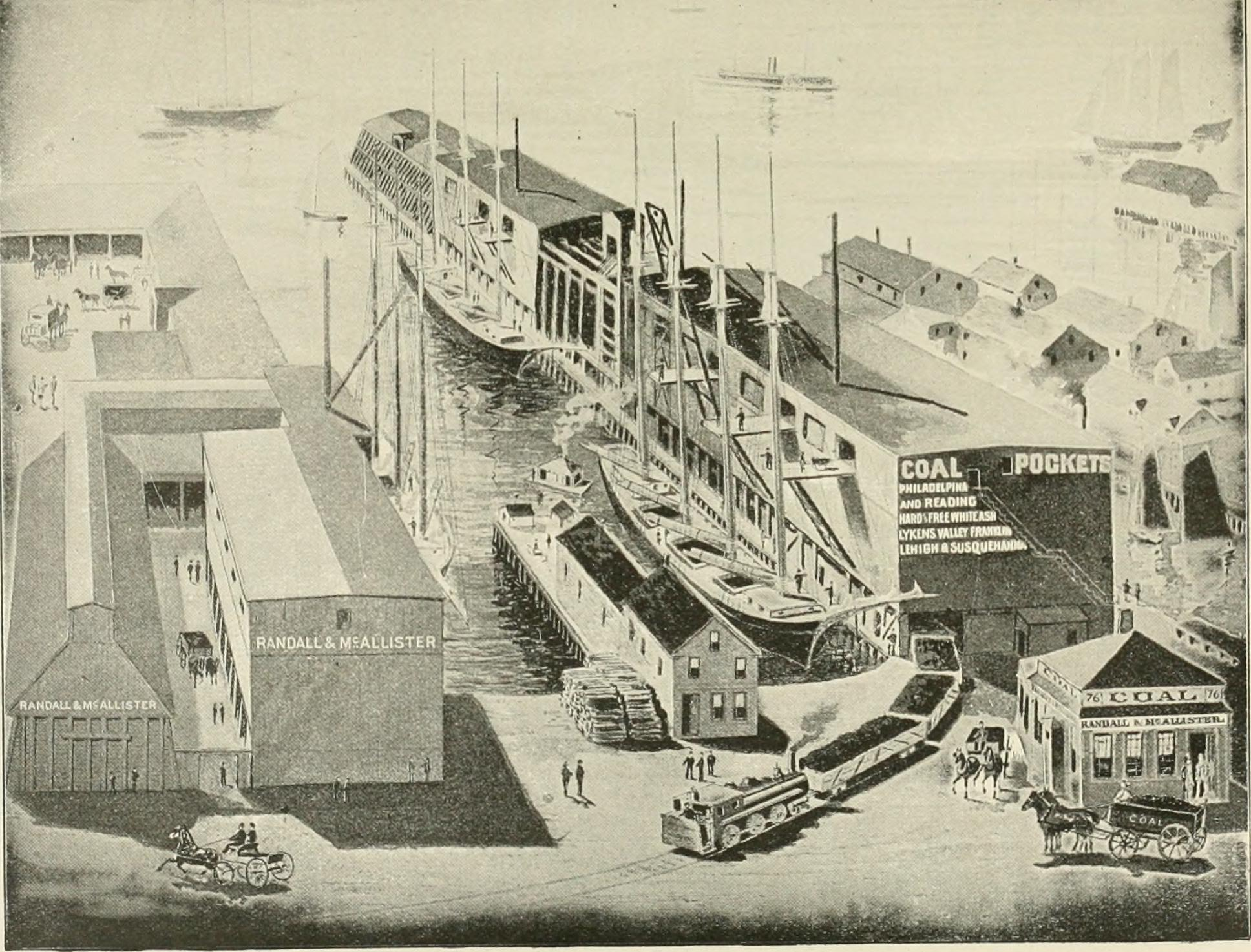
Maine Wharf (left) and Custom House Wharf in the late 19th century

Maine Wharf is a historic wharf in Portland, Maine. It is located on Commercial Street, between Franklin Street and Pearl Street, on the edge of the Fore River. On the waterfront side, it is situated between Maine State Pier (to the north) and Custom House Wharf (to the south).

Today's businesses that exist on the wharf include Scales and Bangs Island Mussels. The former Dry Dock Restaurant & Tavern stands at the head of the wharf in a building formerly occupied by Randall & McAllister. The restaurant closed in 2018, after over thirty years in business.
