= Cumberland Club =

Coordinates: 43.6533°N 70.2626°W

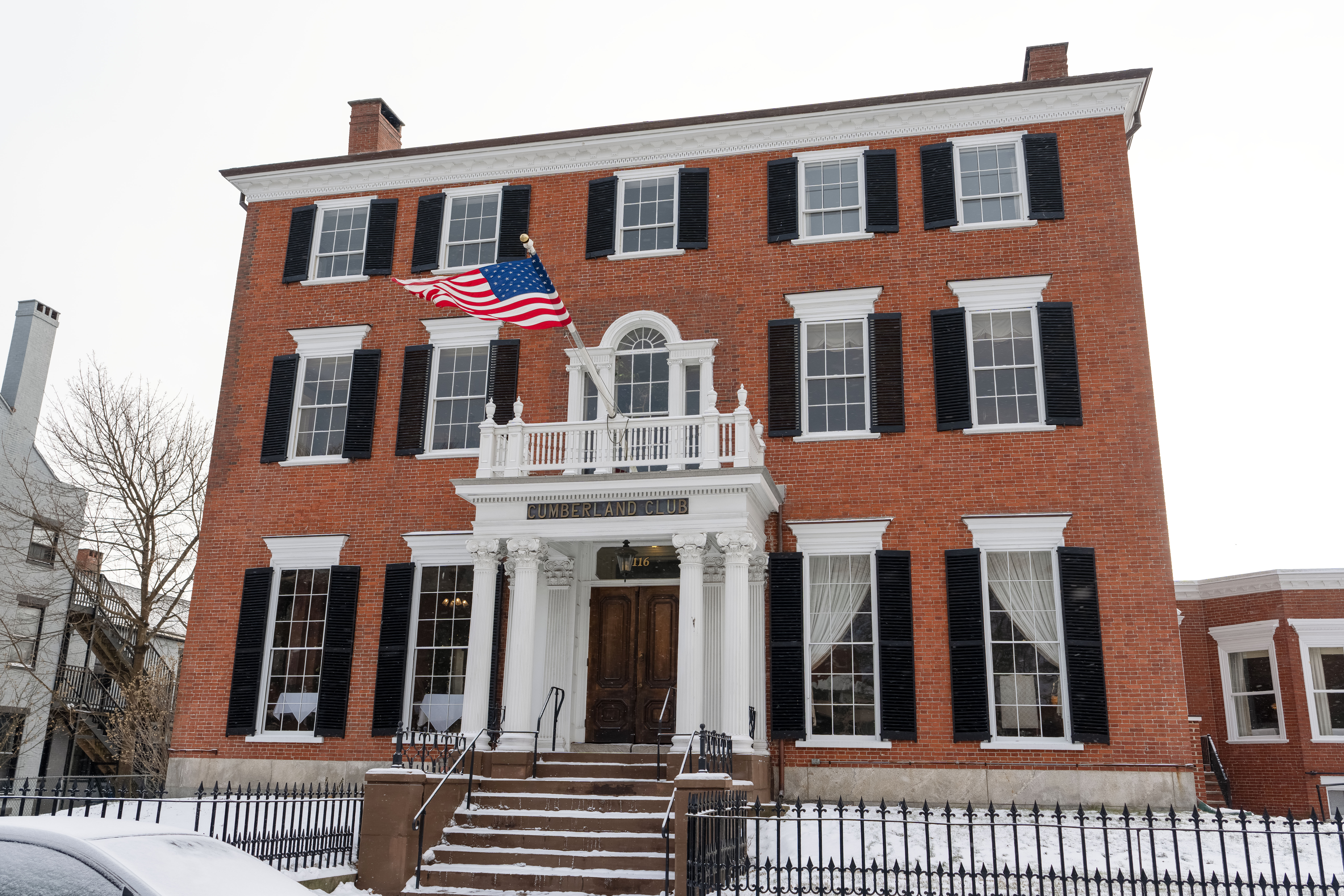
Pictured in 2026

The Cumberland Club is a private members' club in Portland, Maine, United States. It was formed in 1877 and is the oldest social club in the state. The club is located at 116 High Street in the Arts District in a former private home built in 1800. It has been located in the building since 1896. It was one of the political centers of Portland and Maine politics.

It is organized under laws for 501(c)(7) Social and Recreation Clubs. In 2024, it claimed total revenue of $1,295,279 and total assets of $1,864,675.

== History ==
For decades, the club refused to admit Jewish people as members, using a loophole in the law that allowed discrimination by private organizations and by blackballing. This led in the 1950s and 1960s to protests and calls for change. The fight was led by the Republican Party state senator S. Peter Mills Jr., ultimately contributing to legislative efforts in Maine that aimed to eliminate discrimination based on religion, race, or color.

Mills' legislation prohibited Maine authorities from renewing food or liquor licenses to organizations that engaged in discriminatory practices unless they were a genuine religious or ethnic organization. Members of the club objected, citing freedom of association, and refused to obey the new law. When the club's licence came up after the law passed, Portland City Council voted 5–3 to rule that the club was discriminating. They gave them a brief probationary period to change their practices, which they did by offering membership to six Jews and amended its own bylaws to ban membership being decided on the grounds of race, creed or ethnic origin.

== Official site ==
- Cumberland Club
