= Griffin House (Portland, Maine) =

Historic house in Maine, United States

- U.S. National Register of Historic Places
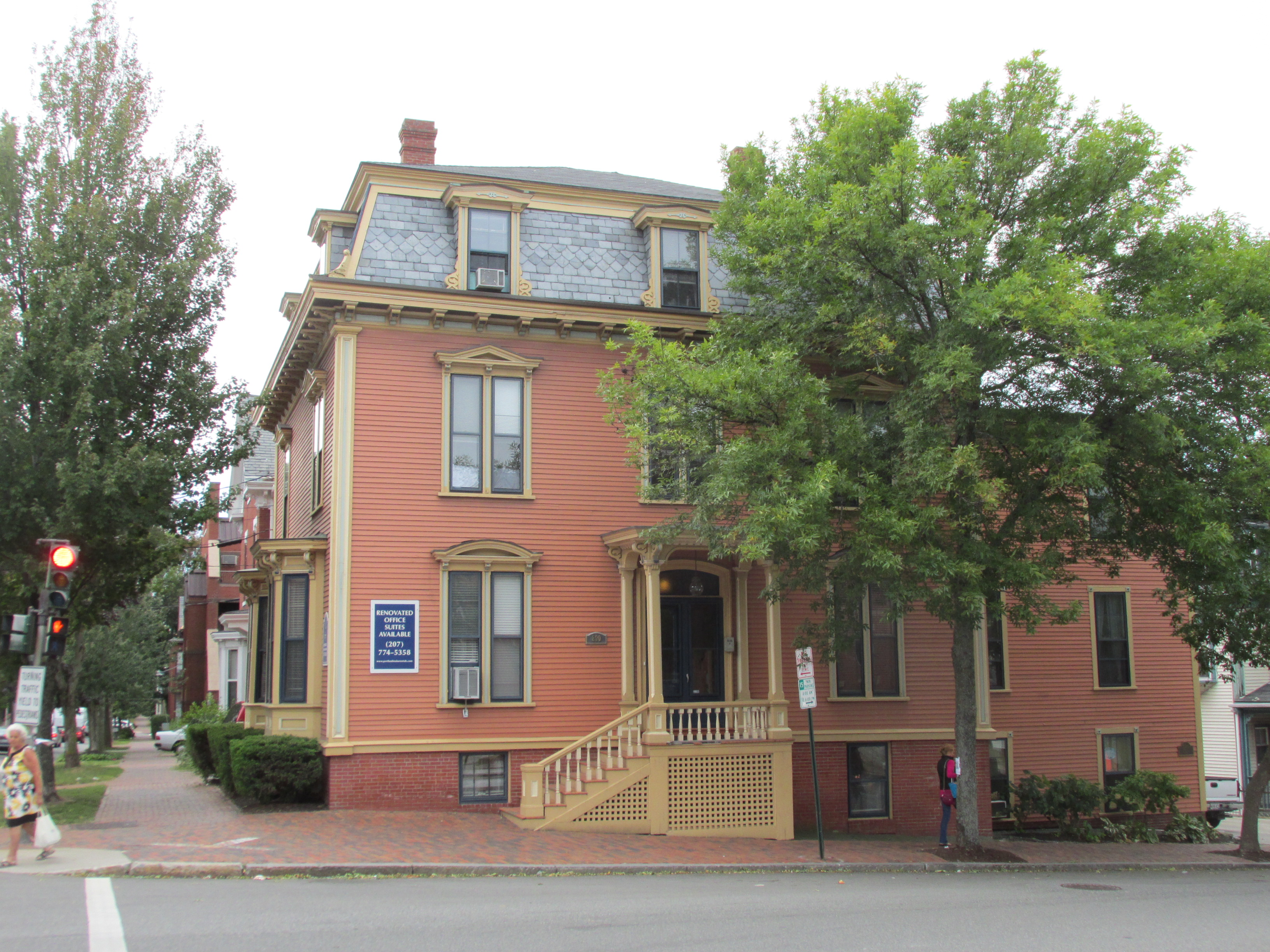
- Griffin House

- Location within Maine Location within the United States
- Location: 200 High Street, Portland, Maine
- Coordinates: 43°39′21″N 70°15′59″W
- Built: 1871
- Architectural style: Second Empire
- NRHP reference No.: 84001360
- Added to NRHP: July 19, 1984

The Griffin House is a historic house at 200 High Street in Portland, Maine. Built in 1871, it is one of the city's finer examples of Second Empire architecture, and was an early example of the trend to build further away from the city's port district. It was listed on the National Register of Historic Places in 1984.

== Description and history ==
The Griffin House is located in a residential area just north of Portland's downtown area, at the northwest corner of High Street and Cumberland Avenue. It is a large 2 1/2-story wood-frame structure, with a mansard roof providing a full third floor, clapboard siding, and a brick foundation. The roof eave is modillioned, and the dormers projecting from it have segmented-arch tops and decorative surrounds. The main facade faces east, and is three bays wide. A side-facing stair leads up to the central entrance, which is sheltered by a porch supported by a bracketed square posts. Windows on the first floor are topped by a segmented arches with ears and brackets, while those on the second floor have eared gables. The building corners sport paneled pilasters.

The house was built in 1871 for Charles S.D. Griffin, an executive of the Portland Gas Company. It was built in the wake of the city's devastating 1866 fire, which destroyed a large portion of its waterfront. At the time of its construction, the area to the north was largely undeveloped. The house remained in the Griffin family until 1936, although it was divided into a two-family in 1876. It underwent a careful restoration in the 1980s.

== See also ==
- National Register of Historic Places listings in Portland, Maine
