= Portland Star Match Factory =

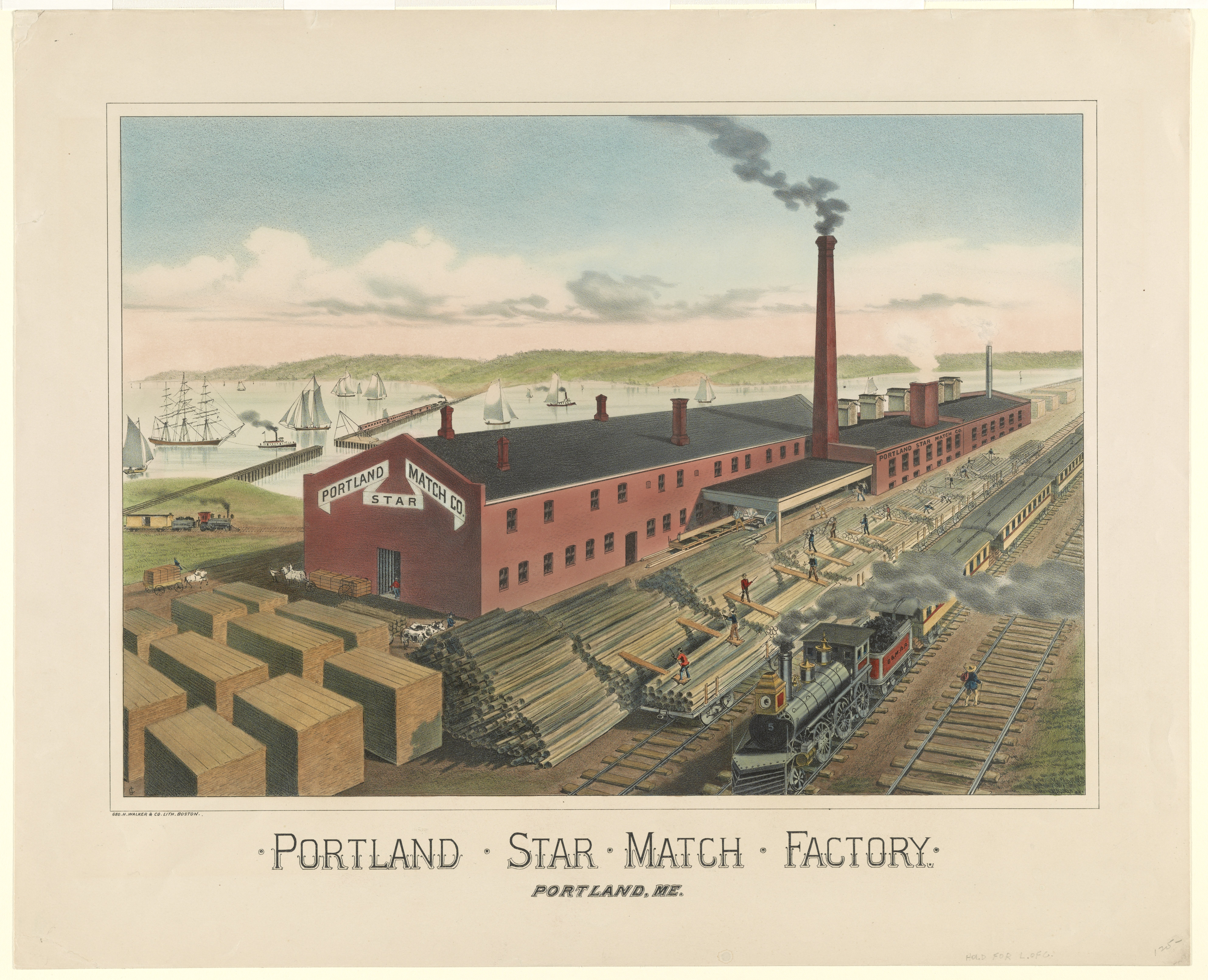
The Star Match Factory in the 19th century.

The Portland Star Match Factory is a historic industrial building on West Commercial Street in Portland, Maine, United States. From 1870 to 1908, approximately 75-100 workers, mostly women, produced matches at the factory.

== Company ==
The Portland Star Match Company was incorporated in 1866 and its original owners sold the company in 1869. In October of that year, a fire burned at the factory's facility near Back Cove. Damage totaled $20,000 and nearly destroyed the original building. The company relocated to West Commercial Street, where it built a new facility.

The company's factory, which was rebuilt in 1870 to a structure 60 feet wide and 110 feet long, was lengthened by 40 feet in 1872, and by an additional 80 feet in 1875. The tracks of the Boston and Maine Railroad ran to the factory, allowing pine logs to be loaded directly from the train cars onto the manufacturing floor.

In 1903, the Portland Board of Trade Journal called the company "one of the most successful industries in the Forest City."
