= Boone's Fish House & Oyster Room =

Boone's Fish House

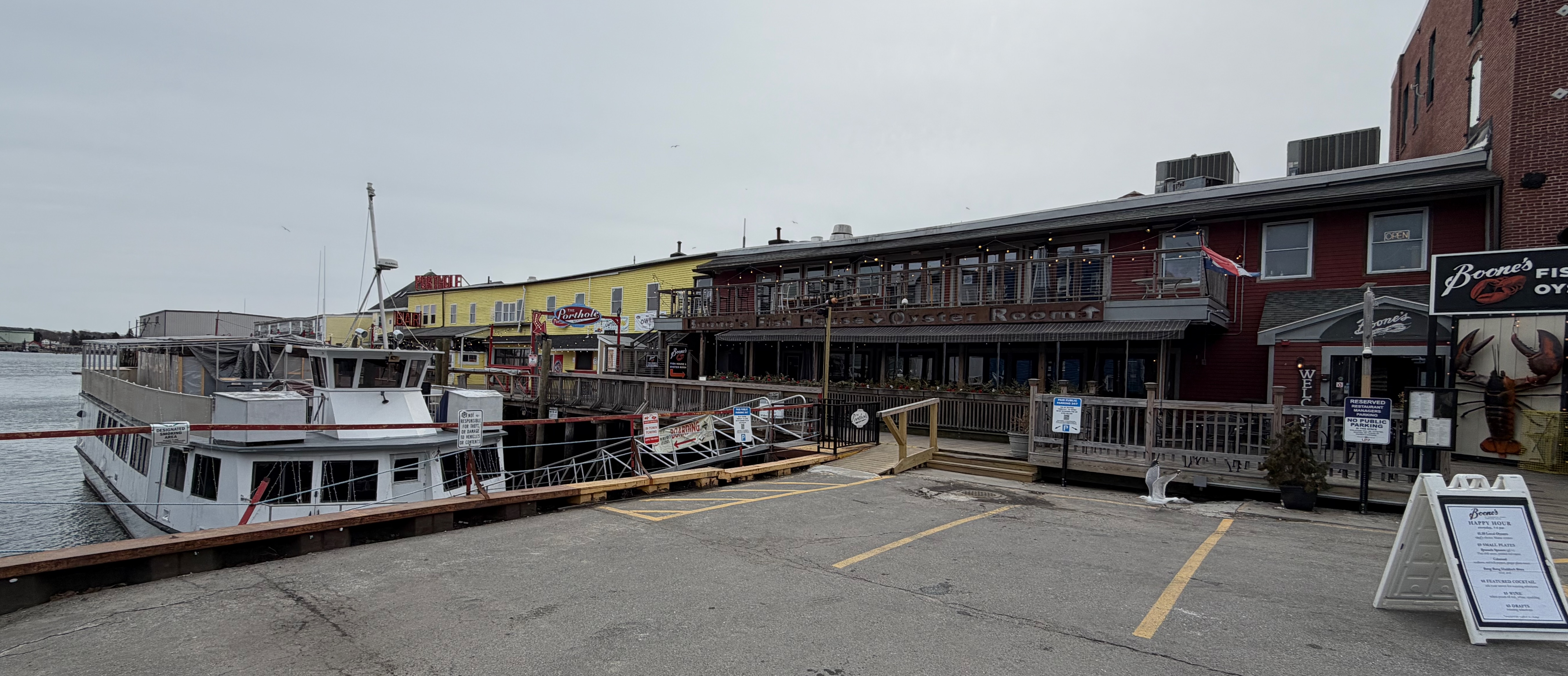
- 2026
- Interactive map of Boone's Fish House

Restaurant information
- Established: 1898 (128 years ago)
- Owner: Darcy Paige Smith
- Previous owner: Gene Boone (c. 1920 to c. 1960)
- Food type: Seafood
- Location: 6 Custom House Wharf, Portland, Maine, 04101, United States
- Coordinates: 43.65670°N 70.25040°W
- Website: boonesfishhouse.com

Boone's Fish House & Oyster Room is a restaurant in the Old Port district of Portland, Maine, United States. Established in 1898, on Custom House Wharf, it is one of the oldest restaurants in the state.

The business, owned Darcy Paige Smith (and her then-husband, Harding Lee Smith), is named for Alexander Boone, who is believed to have created the recipe for stuffed lobster. Alexander's son, Gene, owned the restaurant for around forty years, from the 1920s to the 1960s.

Notable patrons have included Ingrid Bergman, Clark Gable and Marilyn Monroe.
