= Deake's Wharf =

Wharf in Portland, Maine, United States

Coordinates: 43°38′55″N 70°15′26″W

- Location: Commercial Street, Portland, Maine, U.S.

Deake's Wharf is a historic wharf in Portland, Maine, on the edge of the Fore River. It is located on Commercial Street immediately south of Sturdivant's Wharf.

Brawn-Willard Company (later the Brawn Company) opened a sardine factory on the wharf in the early 20th century.
