= Chinese-Americans in Portland, Maine =

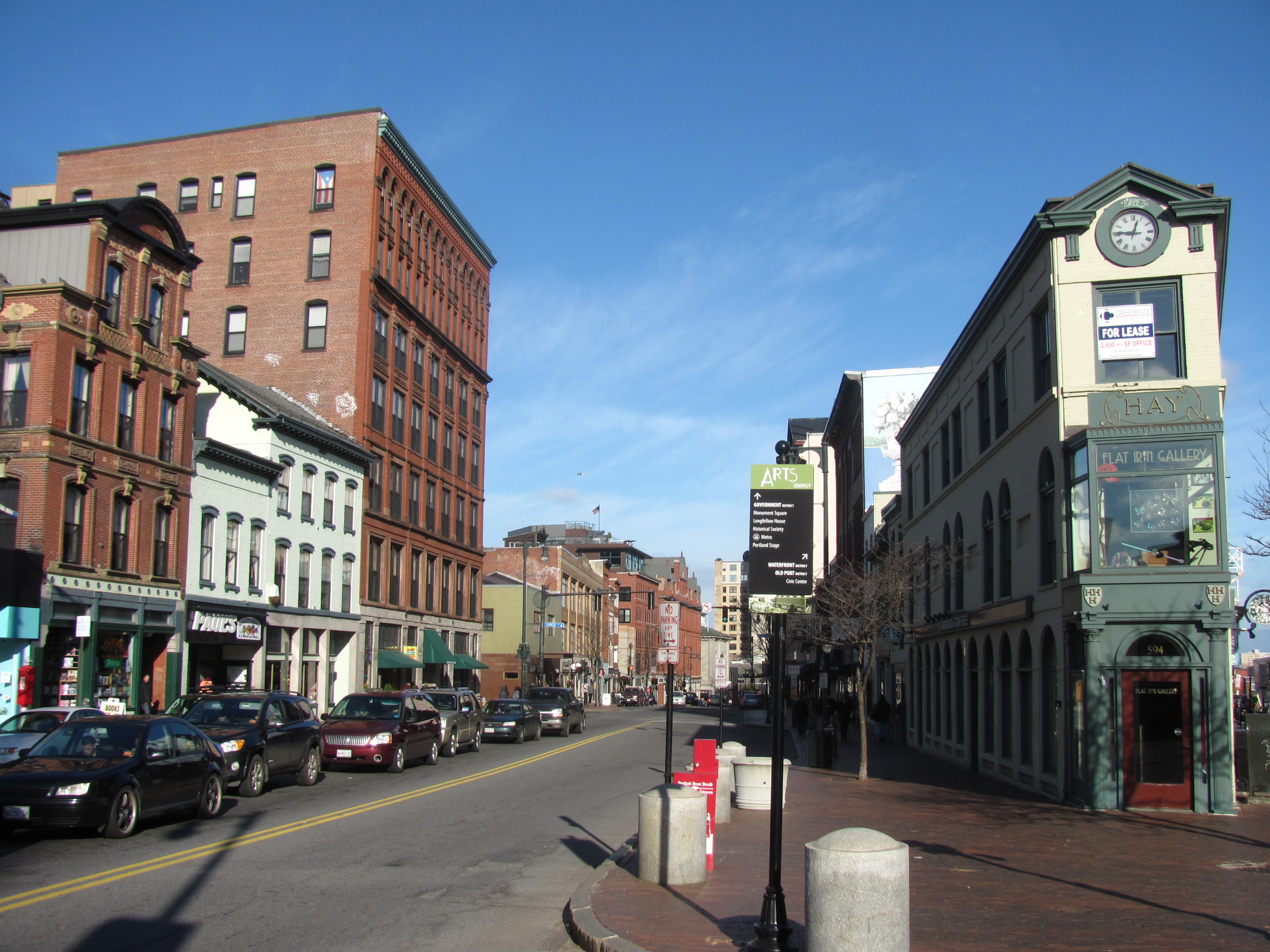
Congress Street was once the center of a "vibrant" Chinatown

Chinese-Americans in Portland, Maine refers to the Chinese-American residents and businesses of Portland, Maine, United States. An informal and small Chinatown once existed around Monument Square. The first Chinese person arrived in 1858 with the Chinatown forming around 1916, mainly lasting until around 1953. The last vestiges of Chinatown existed until 1997, when the last Chinese laundry closed. By that time, urban renewal already claimed all of the remaining buildings.

The Portland area has a small Chinese community, at around one percent. While there are no facets of a Chinatown, there are several Asian/Chinese stores. Asians, including some Chinese, have presence in South Portland and Scarborough, and businesses that target Asian and Chinese patrons are found in those cities, especially Costco in Scarborough, the first branch established in Maine. The Asian population is 3.4%, as of 2023. Aside from Chinese, ethnic Cambodians/Khmer have a community in Portland; over 1,000 Cambodian Americans live in Maine.

== History ==
Portland's Chinatown existed modestly, with most Chinese being isolated as a result of discrimination and the Chinese Exclusion Act of 1882. By 1895, there were enough Chinese people that a Chinese community began to form, though mostly with men whose wives were prohibited from migration by the newly created law. The first Chinese restaurant opened in 1880 at 1 Custom House Wharf. At the time, the city had nine Chinese men. The community celebrated their first Moon Festival on October 8, 1884. Most Chinese men who lived in Chinatown attended the Chinese Sunday School opened by the Second Parish Presbyterian Church in 1888. That Sunday School closed in the late 1890s. The First Baptist Church opened its Chinese Sunday School in 1905. That school lasted until the mid-1950s. Some members of the First Baptist Church's Sunday School went to China as missionaries. The Maine State Laundrymen's Association formed in January 1903, with more than 100 members, to fix prices and bring laundryman together socially. Even though Maine had dozens of Chinese laundries at that time, the Association had no Chinese members. By 1920, around thirty Chinese laundries existed in the city. By around the 1950s, the Chinese community had shrunk to the point that Chinatown almost ceased to exist. By 1966, Chin Kow, called "The General" by his customers and friends, closed Portland's last Chinese laundry, wiping out the last remaining vestige of Chinatown.

== Services ==
There is a Chinese Gospel Church in Portland, and a Chinese community center called the Chinese and American Friendship Association of Maine.
