= Becky's Diner =

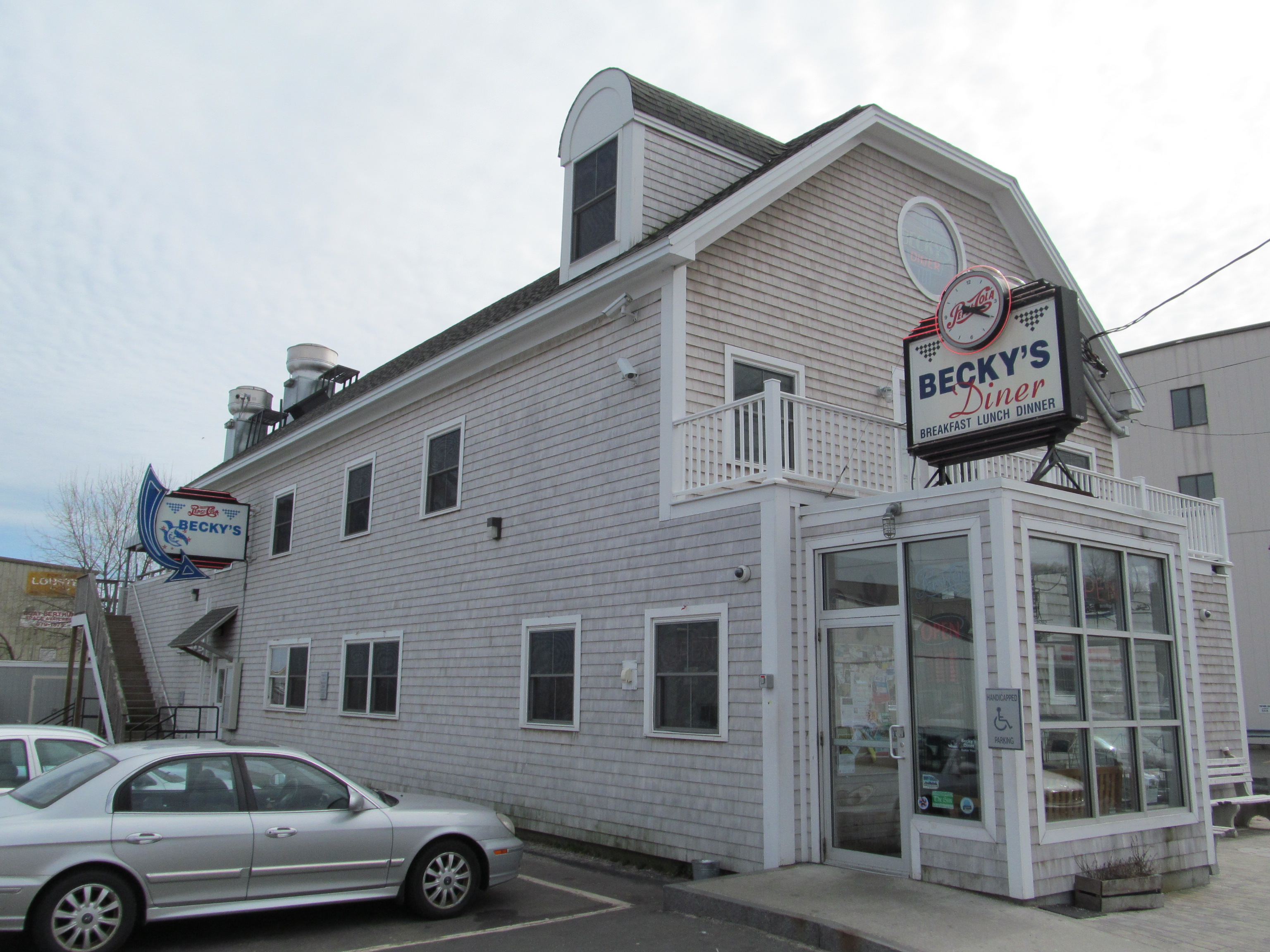
- Pictured in 2012

- Location within Maine Location within the United States

Restaurant information
- Established: March 1991
- Owner: Becky Rand
- Food type: Seafood
- Location: 390 Commercial Street, Portland
- Coordinates: 43°39′02″N 70°15′25″W
- Other information: Renovated 2007
- Website: www.beckysdiner.com

Becky's Diner is a diner on Commercial Street in Portland, Maine. It is located at the head of Hobson's Wharf on Portland's waterfront.

== History ==
Becky's Diner opened in 1991 with an exception to the city's zoning laws prohibiting non-fishery businesses in the location. Owner Becky Rand, a mother of six, argued that fishermen needed a place to eat before and after work, which was lacking because of their unusual hours. Several years after opening, her success allowed for new hours to be added during the middle of the night on weekends. In 1995, Becky's added a dinner menu, being served from 4:00 AM to closing time (9:00 PM).

== Accolades ==
In 2005, Becky's received coverage in Gourmet Magazine and a spot on Rachael Ray's Food Network program $40 a Day. The Portland Phoenix named it the Best Greasy Spoon of 2008.

In 2016, the diner was featured in the Guy Fieri Diners, Drive-Ins and Dives Thanksgiving episode. Rand made her sausage stuffing.

In 2024, the opening scene of crime writer John Connolly's book The Instruments of Darkness was set in Becky's Diner.

Notable patrons include Taylor Swift and former president Bill Clinton.
