= Maine State Pier =

Pier in Portland, Maine, United States

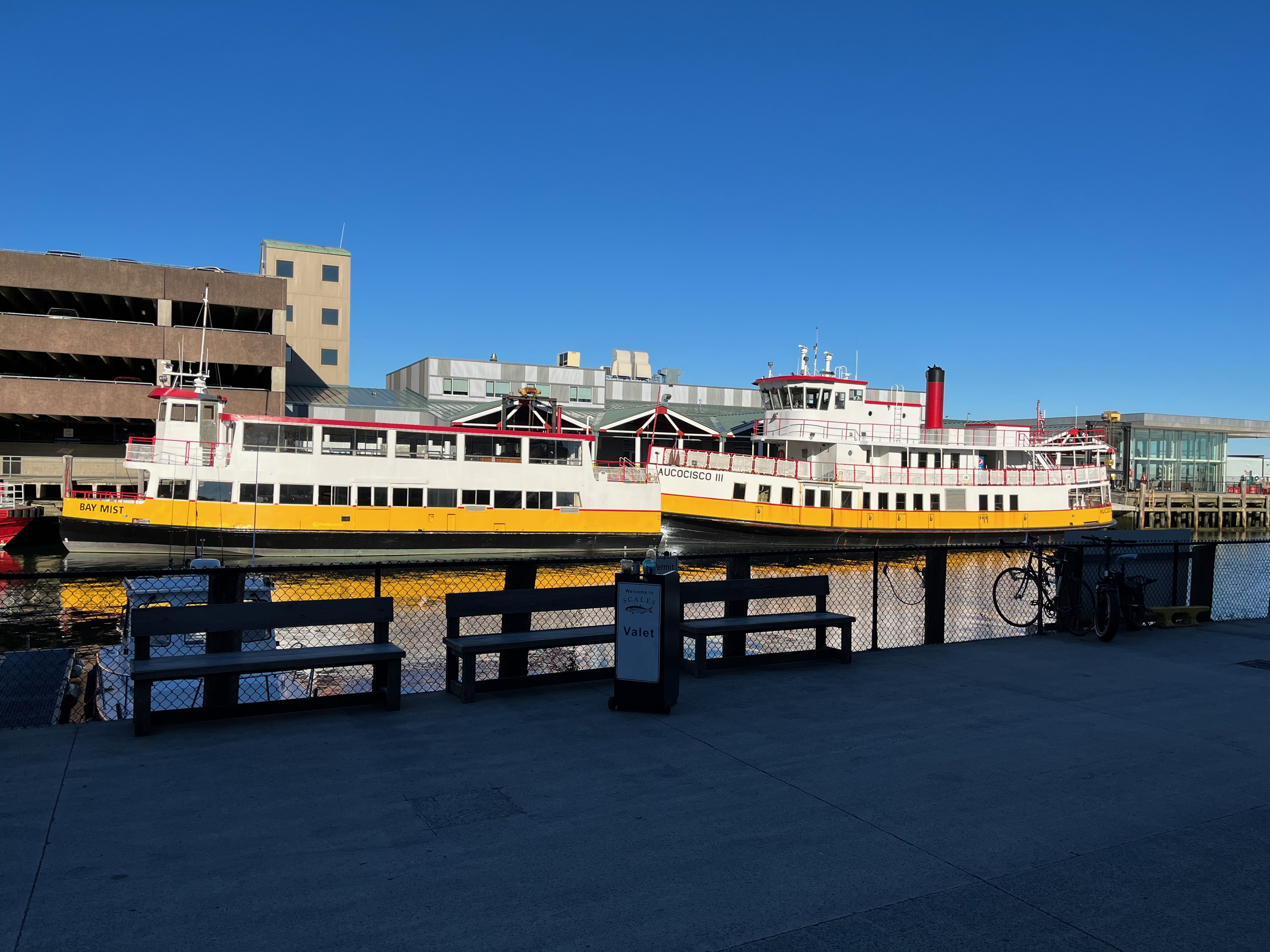
- Casco Bay Lines' Bay Mist and Aucocisco III berthed at the pier
- Interactive map of Maine State Pier
- Location: Commercial Street, Portland, Maine, U.S.
- Coordinates: 43.6571°N 70.2482°W

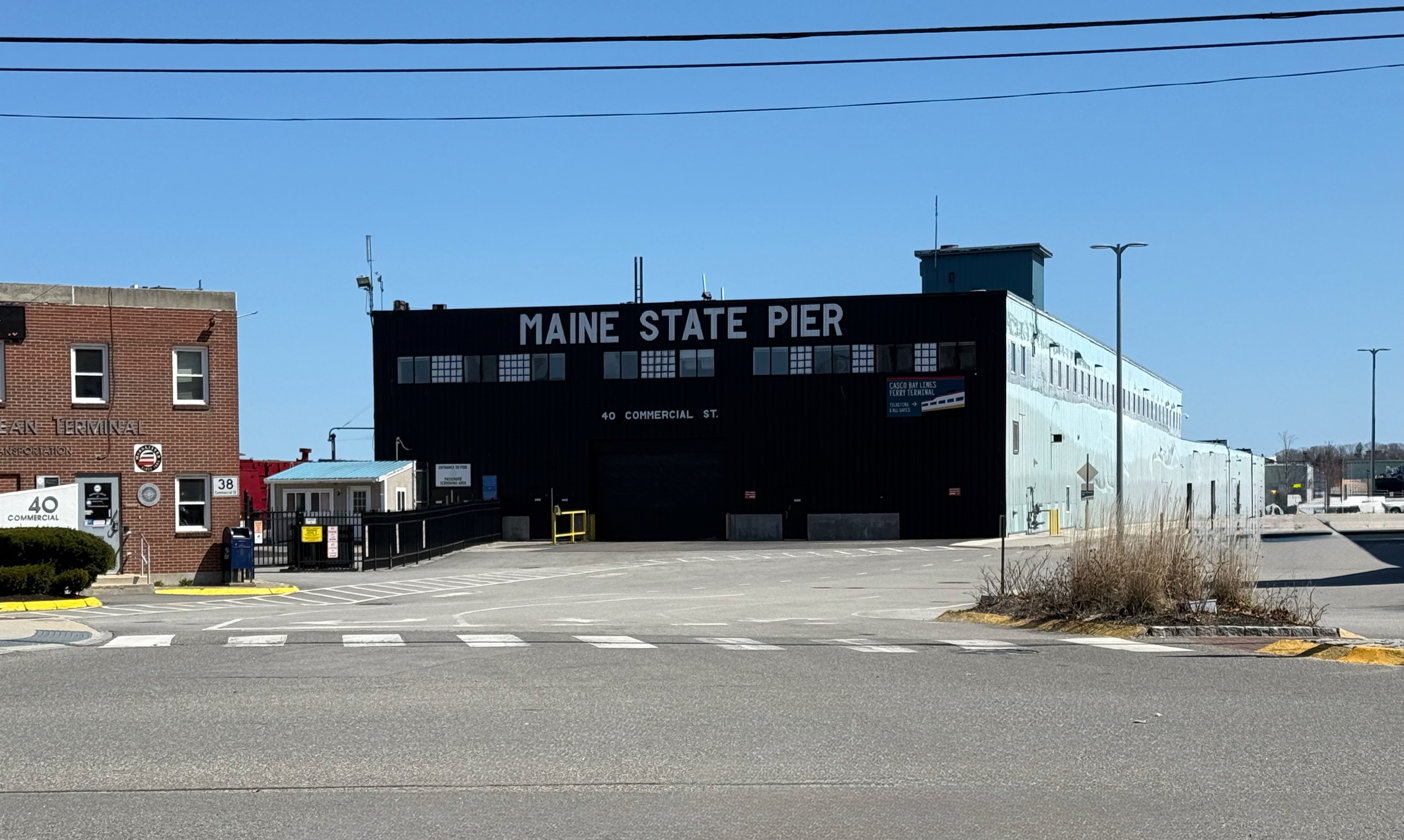
The head of the pier, viewed from Commercial Street in 2025

The Maine State Pier is a municipal-owned deepwater marine facility and music venue located at the intersection of Commercial Street and Franklin Street on the eastern waterfront in Portland, Maine.

Located to the north of Maine Wharf, it was completed in 1924. In the mid-2000s, competing proposals were examined to redevelop the Maine State Pier into a tourist destination, but difficulties with state regulations and the late-2000s recession halted proposed redevelopment. In 2009, the first annual Portland Lobster Fest was held at the State Pier.

In 2009, the Portland City Council approved spending $2.4 million to redevelop the end of pier. Improvements included the creation of an outdoor music venue. In 2011, rapper Wiz Khalifa and others appeared at the venue. In 2016, Maine native Howie Day performed "Collide" and other songs at the pier. In '07, Grace Potter & the Nocturnals from Vermont played there. Boston acts Guster played there in '09, and Rachel Platten in 2015. The venue has a maximum capacity of 3,000.

During the 2011 Portland mayoral campaign, several candidates, including former State Senator Ethan Strimling made the lack of redevelopment at the Maine State Pier a key campaign issue. Many of Strimling's largest campaign donors were employees of Ocean Properties, one of the companies which sought to redevelop the pier during the 2000s.

== See also ==
- Clay Cove
- 2024 Portland flood
