= High Street (Portland, Maine) =

Downtown street in Portland, Maine

Coordinates: 43.65398°N 70.26317°W

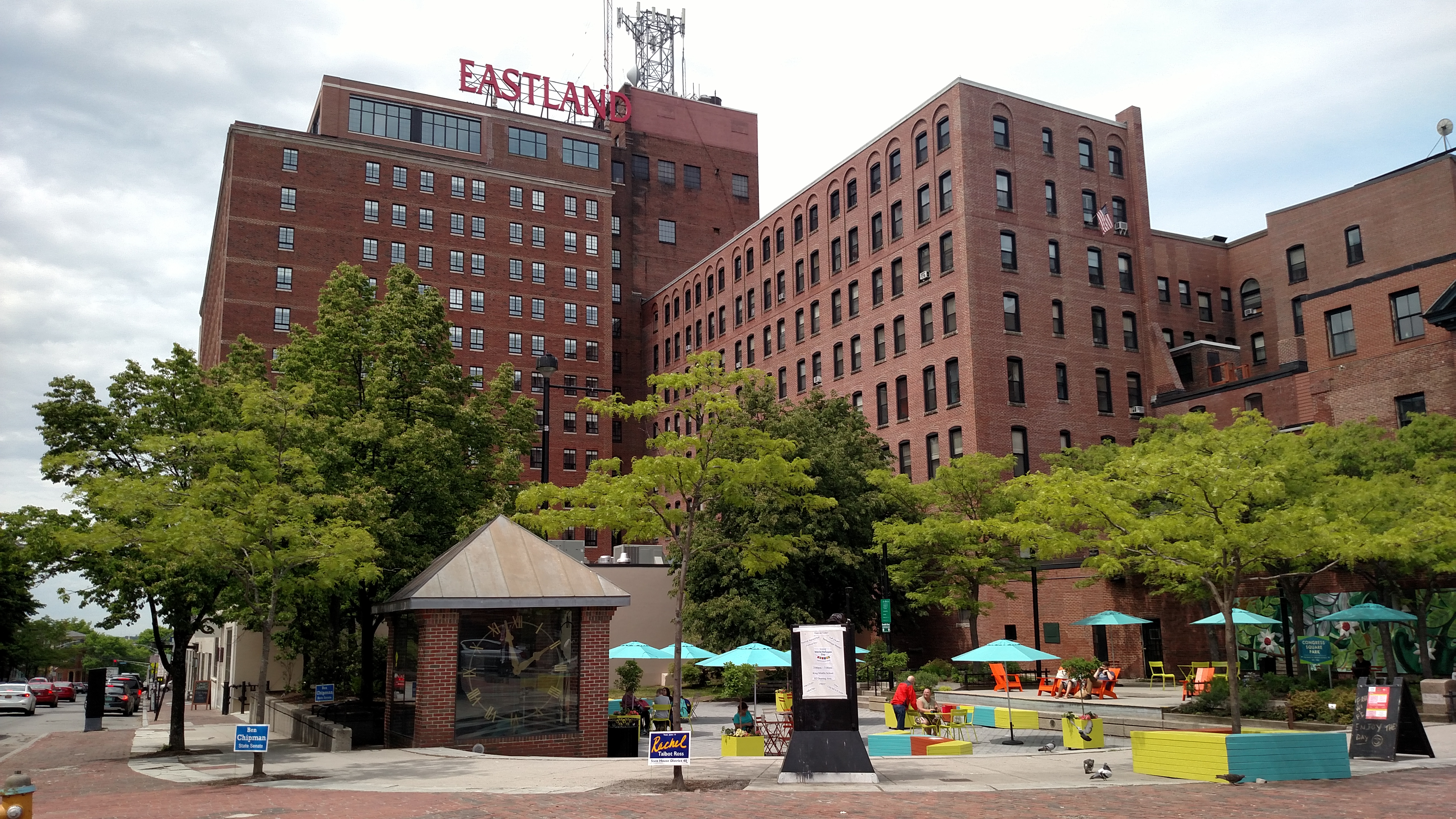
- The former Eastland Hotel (now the Westin Portland Harborview) on High Street
- Interactive map of High Street
- Length: 0.81 mi (1.30 km)
- Location: Portland, Maine, U.S.
- Northwest end: Forest Avenue
- Southeast end: Commercial Street

High Street is a downtown street in Portland, Maine, United States. It runs one-way for around 0.81 miles (1.30 km), from Commercial Street in the southeast to Forest Avenue in the northwest. It is one of the three main routes crossing the Portland peninsula in this direction, the other two being State Street and Franklin Street. Part of the street passes through the Spring Street Historic District and the city's Arts District.

High Street and State Street were converted from two-way traffic in 1972.

== Route ==
Running one-way for its entire length, High Street begins at Commercial Street, directly opposite Becky's Diner, on a steep incline. The slope is shared with Park Street, on the opposite side of the Irving gas station separating the two. The hill continues until it crests at Congress Street, which in this section is in Congress Square. From there, a steep decline begins to its intersection with Forest Avenue. The street passes through the eastern edge of Deering Oaks Park for its final 700 feet (210 m) or so, before it intersects with Forest Avenue at the beginning of U.S. Route 302. The section from Congress Street to York Street was opened in 1788; the section from Congress Street to Cumberland Avenue was completed in 1850.

Streetcars of the Portland and Forest Avenue Railroad Company (chartered in 1860) formerly ran along High Street en route to Spring Street and Clark Street.

== Notable addresses ==
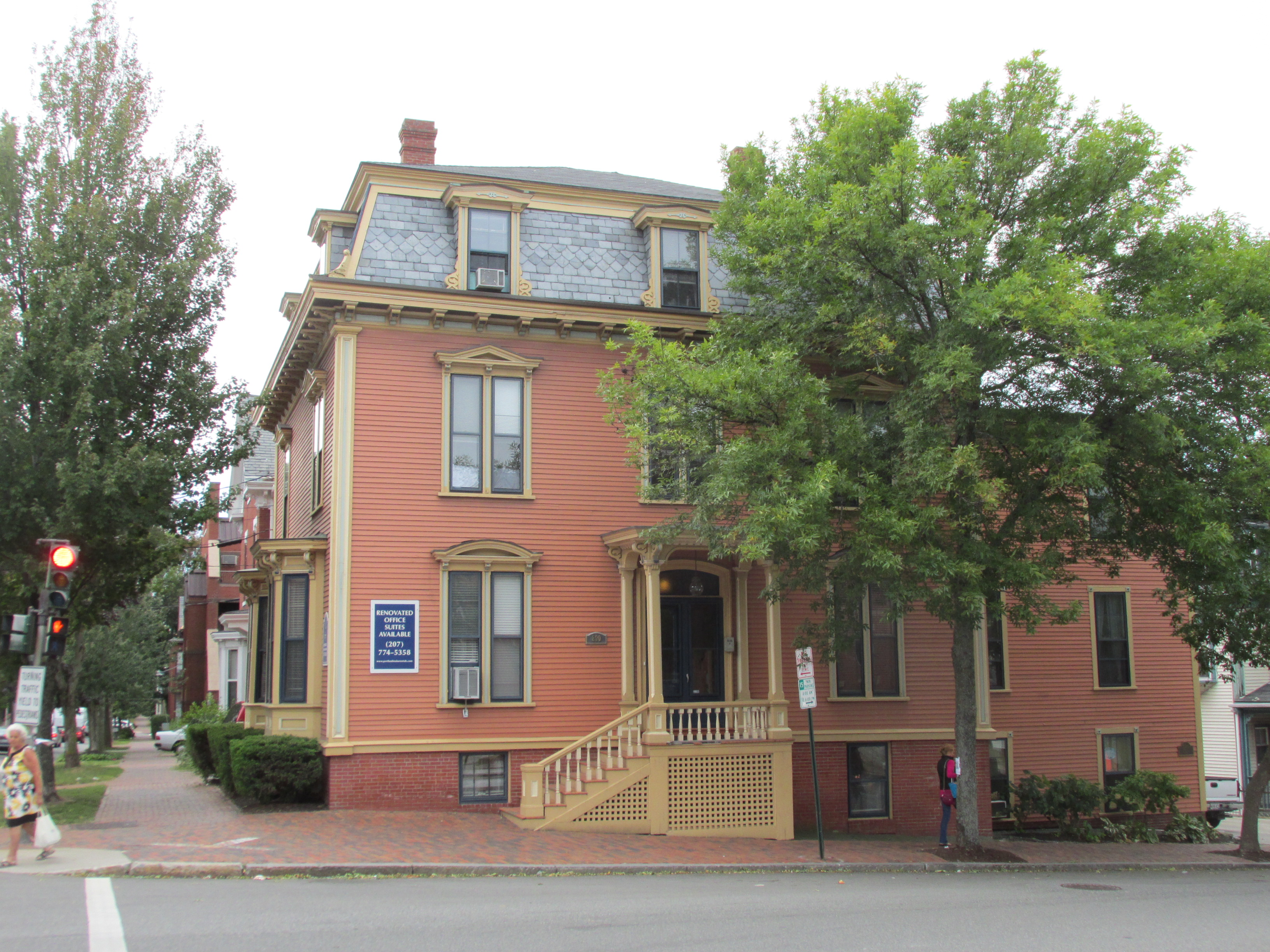
Griffin House, built in 1871, stands at 200 High Street

From southeast to northwest:

- Children's Hospital (former; 1909), 68 High Street (listed on the National Register of Historic Places)
- Ingraham Carriage Barn (1800), 79 High Street
- Safford House (1858), 93 High Street
- Cumberland Club (1800), 116 High Street
- McLellan-Sweat Mansion (1801), 111 High Street (listed on the National Register of Historic Places)
- Portland Museum of Art (1983), corner of Congress Square and High Street
- State Theatre (1929), western corner of Congress Street and High Street
- Westin Portland Harborview (1927), 157 High Street
- The Marlborough (1914), 180–188 High Street
- Griffin House (1871), 200 High Street (listed on the National Register of Historic Places)

== Public transportation ==
Greater Portland Metro's route 8 (Peninsula Loop) and South Portland Bus Service's routes 21 (Willard Square/Southern Maine Community College), 24A (The Maine Mall via Main Street) and 24B (The Maine Mall via Community Center) serve High Street.
