= Custom House Wharf =

Historic wharf in Portland, Maine, U.S.

Coordinates: 43°39′24″N 70°14′57″W

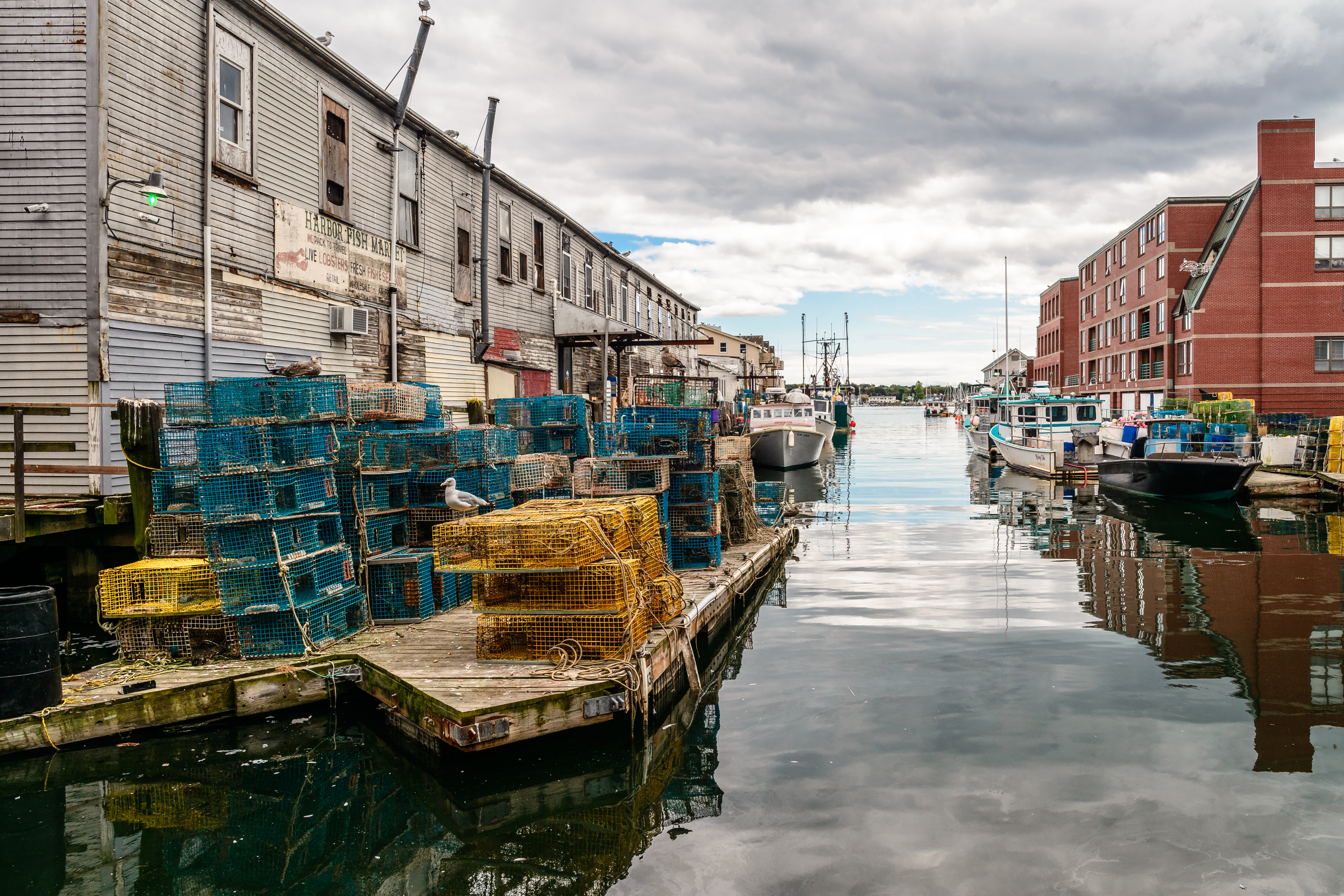
- Custom House Wharf (left) and Portland Pier
- Location: Commercial Street, Portland, Maine, U.S.

Custom House Wharf is a historic wharf in Portland, Maine, on the edge of the Fore River at the intersection of Pearl Street and Commercial Street. The wharf covers 1.5 acres, has more than 100,000 square feet of commercial space and 3,700 feet of dock space. Named for Portland's United States Custom House, which stands across Commercial Street from the wharf, on Fore Street, the wharf is located between Maine Wharf (to the north) and Portland Pier (to the south).

== History ==
The wharf was built prior to 1807 by the McGowan family. The family owned the wharf for more than 200 years before selling it in 2021. In 1880, Maine's first-known Chinese restaurant was opened by Ar Tee Lam at 1 Custom House Wharf. In the late 19th century into the 20th century, the Casco Bay Lines ferry lines docked at Custom House Wharf.

Today's businesses that exist on the wharf include Harbor Fish Market (on its southern side), Boone's Fish House & Oyster Room (northern side), and The Porthole pub, which was established in 1929.

== Flooding ==
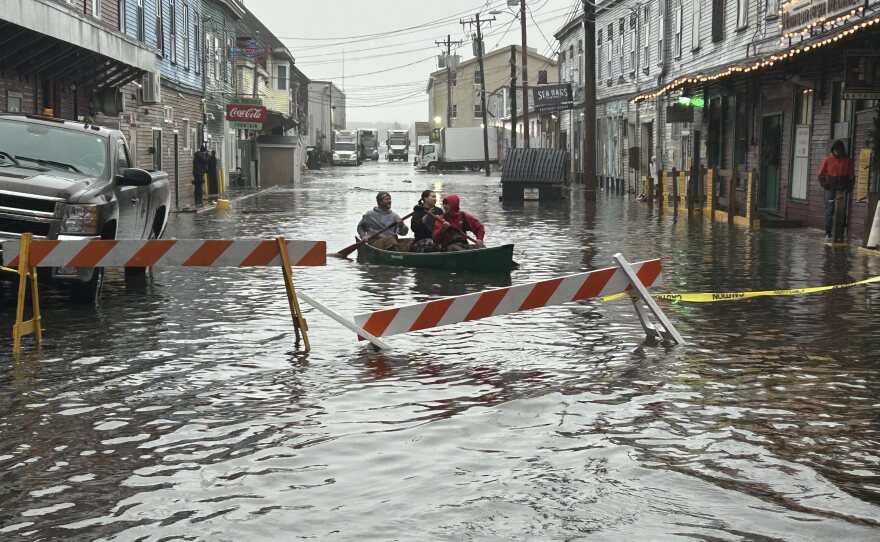
Custom House Wharf during 2024 flood.

The wharf is regularly affected by coastal flooding. During a 2024 flood, Harbor Fish Market had two feet of water inside the store and stayed open as customers waded in.

== 2025 fire ==
On December 26, 2025, a three-alarm fire destroyed two addresses and four businesses on the wharf and damaged several others. The buildings destroyed were at 25 and 27 Custom House Wharf. The buildings housed a boat repair shop, Nanuq Kayaks, Marine Antiques and the Sea Bags Factory Store.

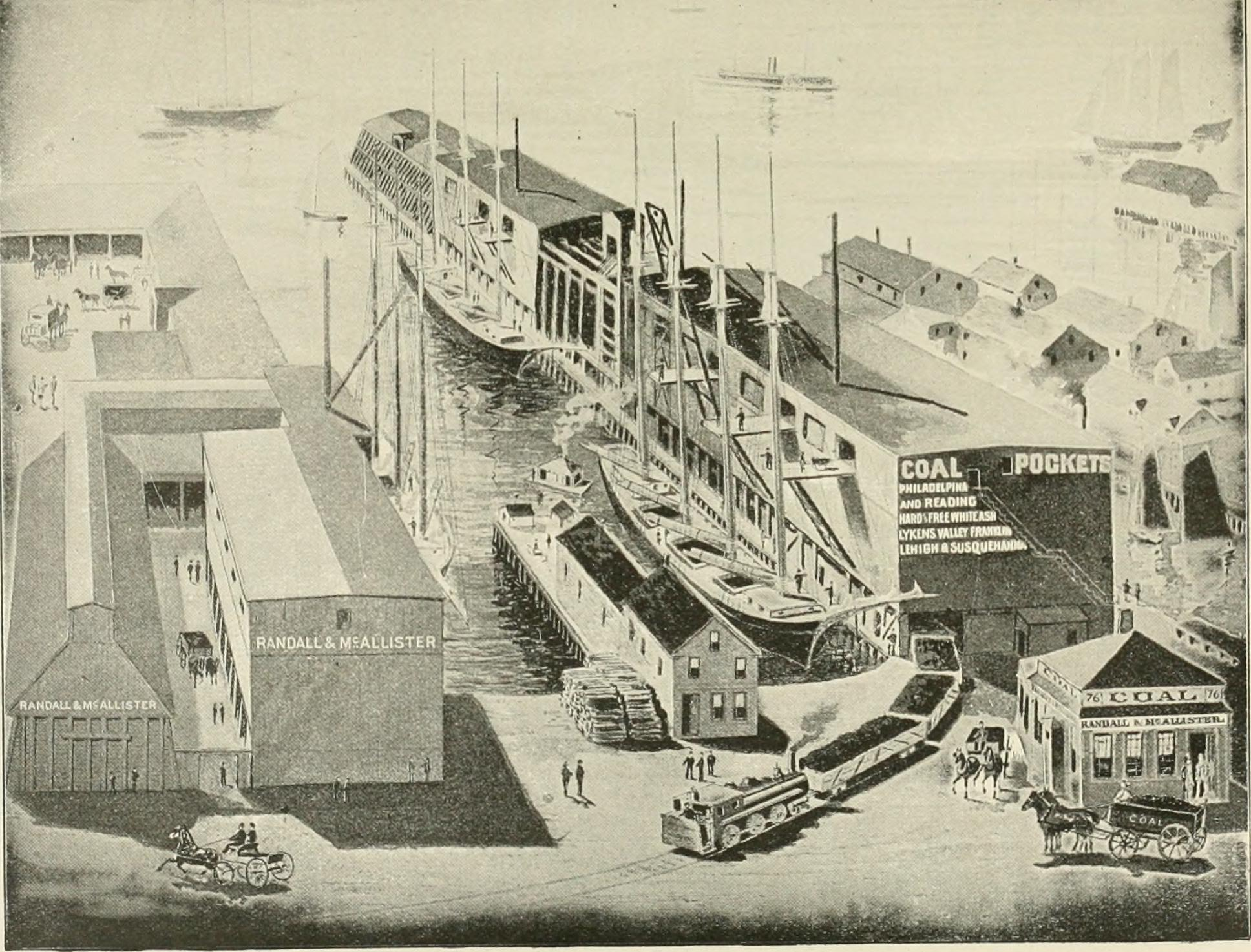
Maine Wharf (left) and Custom House Wharf in the late 19th century

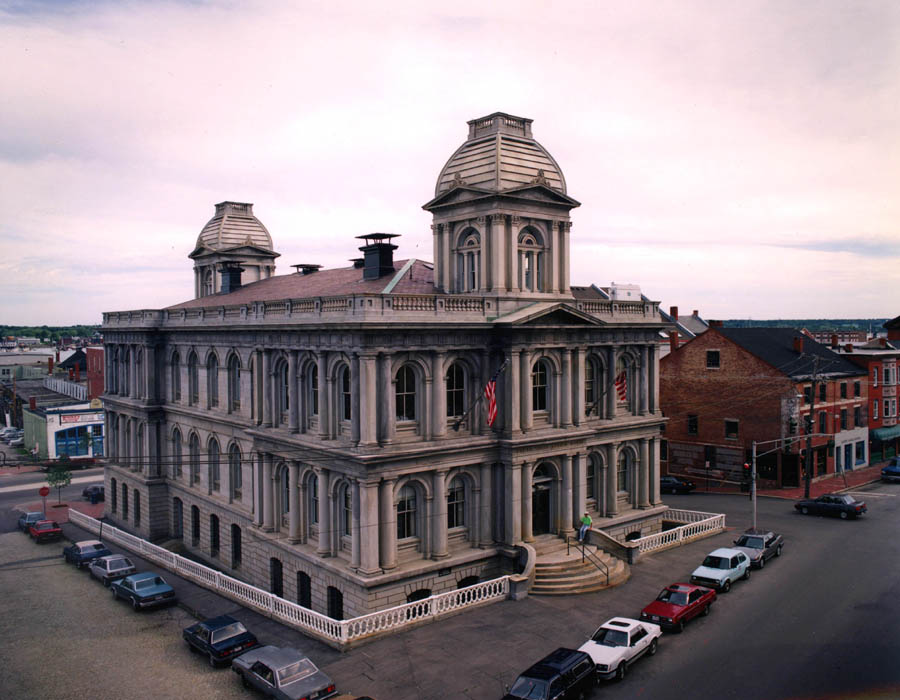
Portland's Custom House, with the wharf located across Commercial Street behind it

== See also ==
- Chinese-Americans in Portland, Maine
- Old Port of Portland, Maine
