= Portland Pier =

Pier in Portland, Maine, United States

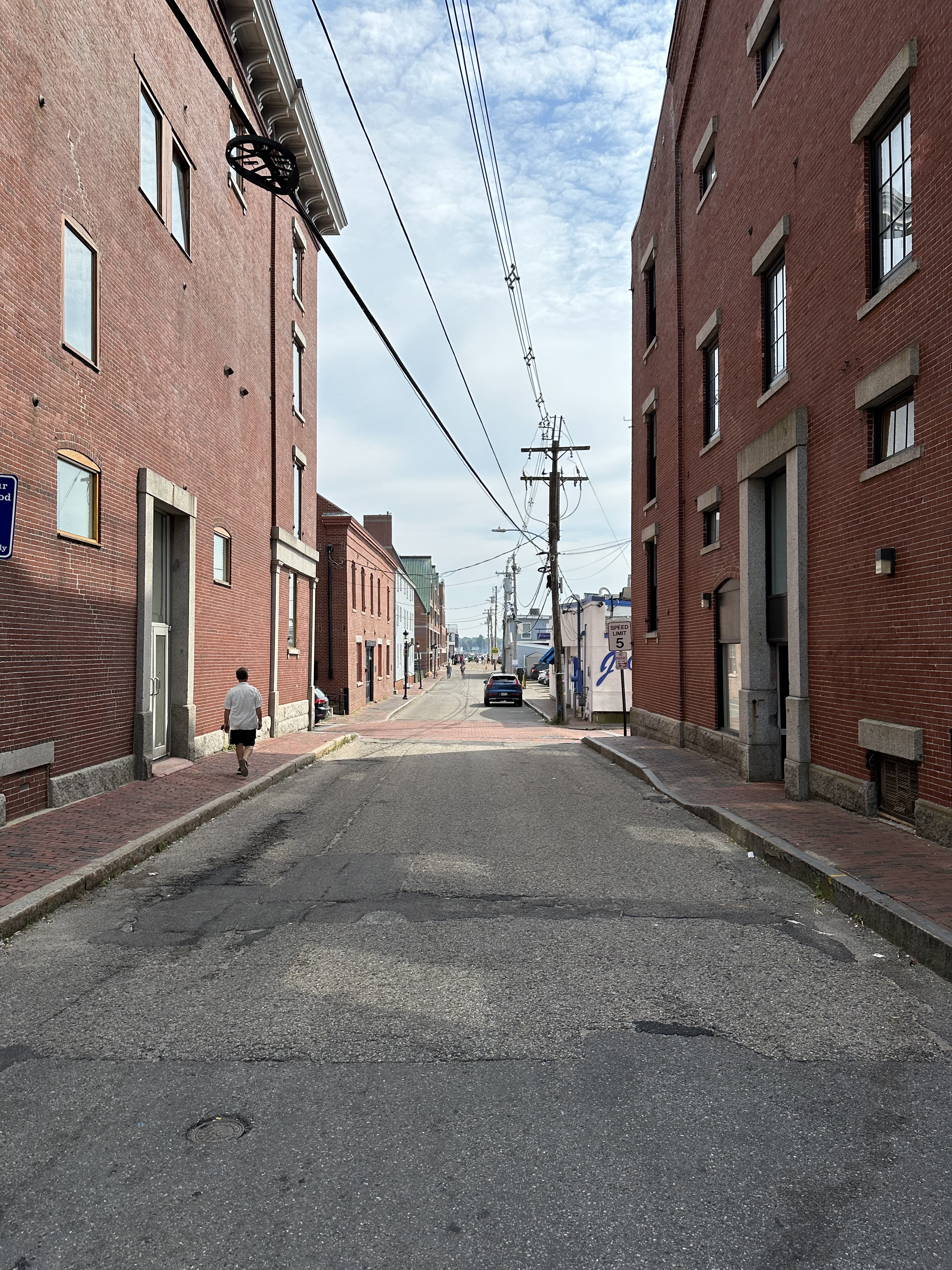
- Portland Pier (2023)
- Interactive map of Portland Pier
- Location: Commercial Street, Portland, Maine, U.S.
- Coordinates: 43°39′20″N 70°15′2″W

Portland Pier is located at the intersection of Commercial Street and Silver Street on the eastern waterfront in Portland, Maine. It is located between Custom House Wharf (to the north) and Long Wharf (to the south), on the edge of the Fore River.

Notable businesses on the pier include J's Oyster House and Luke's Lobster.

The pier is subject to regular flooding during king tides and any tide 12 feet or higher.

== Architecture ==
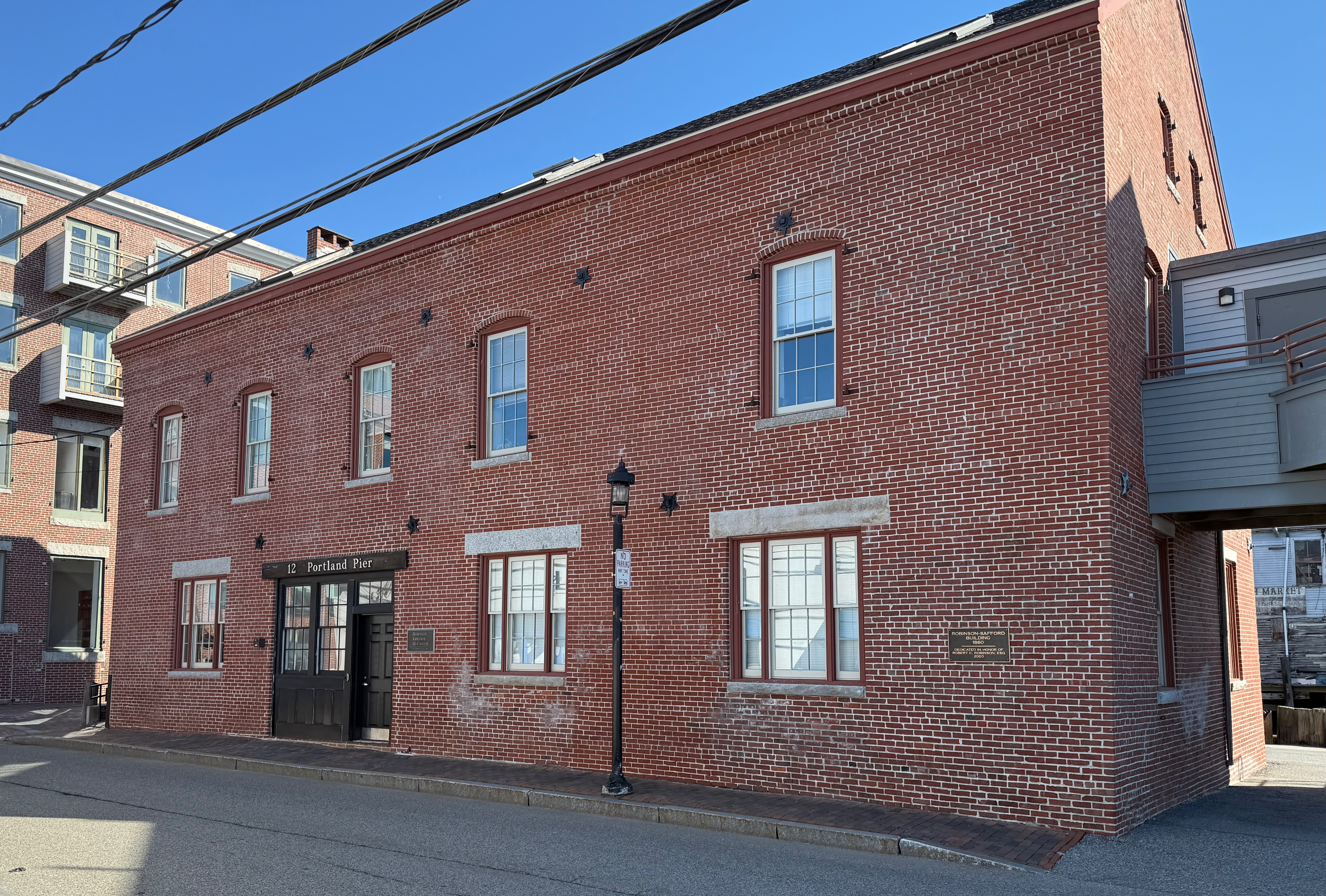
The Robinson–Safford Building, at 12 Portland Pier, survived Portland's great fire of 1866

== See also ==
- 2024 Portland flood
