= Commercial Street, Portland, Maine =

Street in Portland, Maine, United States

Coordinates: 43.653655°N 70.255686°W

Commercial Street
- Thames Street (originally)
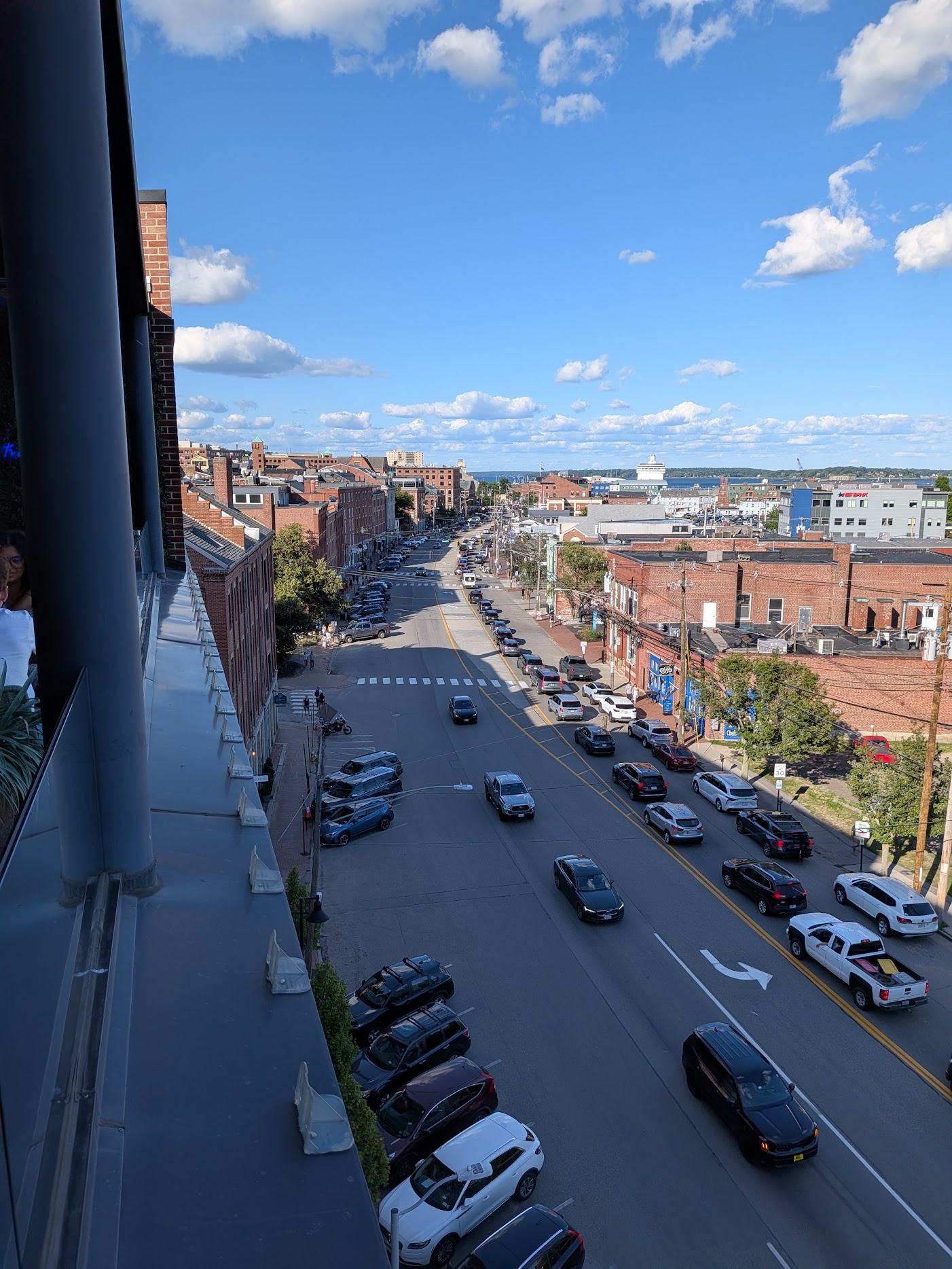
- Looking northeast in 2026
- Interactive map of Commercial Street
- Part of: US 1A
- Length: 2 mi (3.2 km)
- Location: Portland, Maine, U.S.
- Northeast end: India Street and Thames Street
- Southwest end: Valley Street and US 1A (Fore River Parkway)

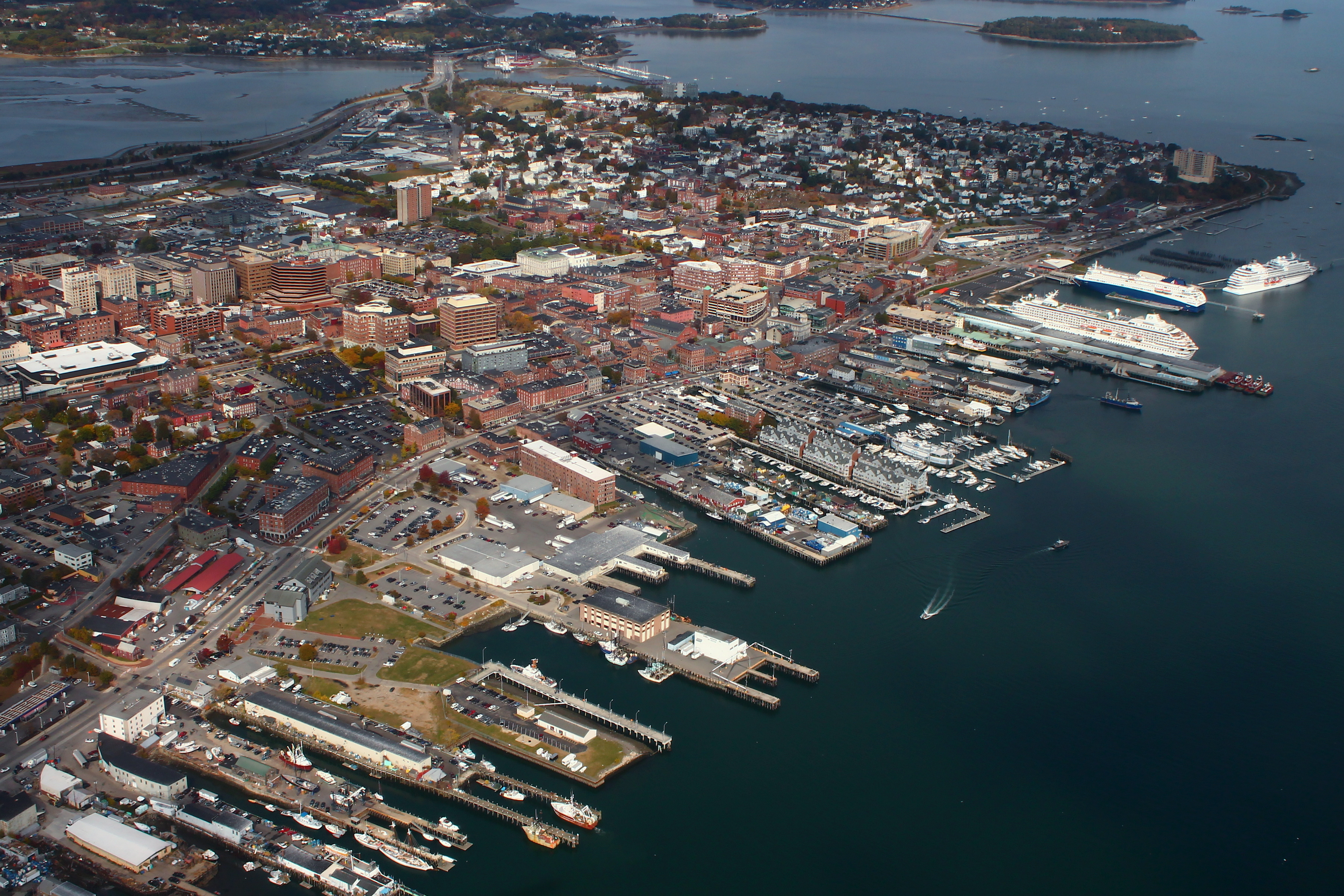
Commercial Street and its wharves and piers running along the Fore River estuary

Commercial Street is a downtown street in the Old Port of Portland, Maine, United States. It is part of U.S. Route 1A. It became the Old Port's waterfront in the early 20th century, replacing Fore Street, after land was reclaimed from the waters of Casco Bay and the Fore River.

Built upon old piers in the 1850s, fill was pushed into Casco Bay to accommodate the growing Portland Terminal Company railroad and warehousing needs of the port's working waterfront. In the 1970s and 1980s, much of the economic activity on the street was hurt and many of the properties on the street were sold off for non-marine development, including the building of condominiums. In 1987, Portland voters, led by local fisherman based on Commercial Street, halted all non-marine development along the street and adjacent docks. Marine development around Commercial Street returned in the 1990s and 2000s (decade) alongside other economic development, including tourism-related industries.

The Maine State Pier, a deepwater marine facility and outdoor music venue, is located at the intersection of Commercial Street and Franklin Street. The former Portland Star Match Factory is located at 65–89 West Commercial Street, near the West End. Jordan's Ready to Eat Meats formerly occupied the northwestern corner of Silver Street and Commercial Street. It moved to Fore Street and India Street in the early 1960s.

The street, which was originally known as Thames Street, becomes West Commercial Street from beneath the Casco Bay Bridge heading west. Thames Street still exists from India Street heading northeast, eventually merging into footpaths beneath the Eastern Promenade.

In 2008, it was named one of the ten best streets in the United States by the American Planning Association.

== Wharves and piers ==
The below sixteen wharves and piers are located along Commercial Street. By the time of Commercial Street's completion in 1853, four of today's remaining wharves (Chandler's, Union, Merrill's and Berlin Mills) had built tracks to Commercial Street to improve trade opportunities.

Three wharves (Richardson's, Brown's and Smith's) were demolished with the creation of the City of Portland Fish Pier at the foot of Center Street.

From north to south, with the aligning street(s) noted where applicable:

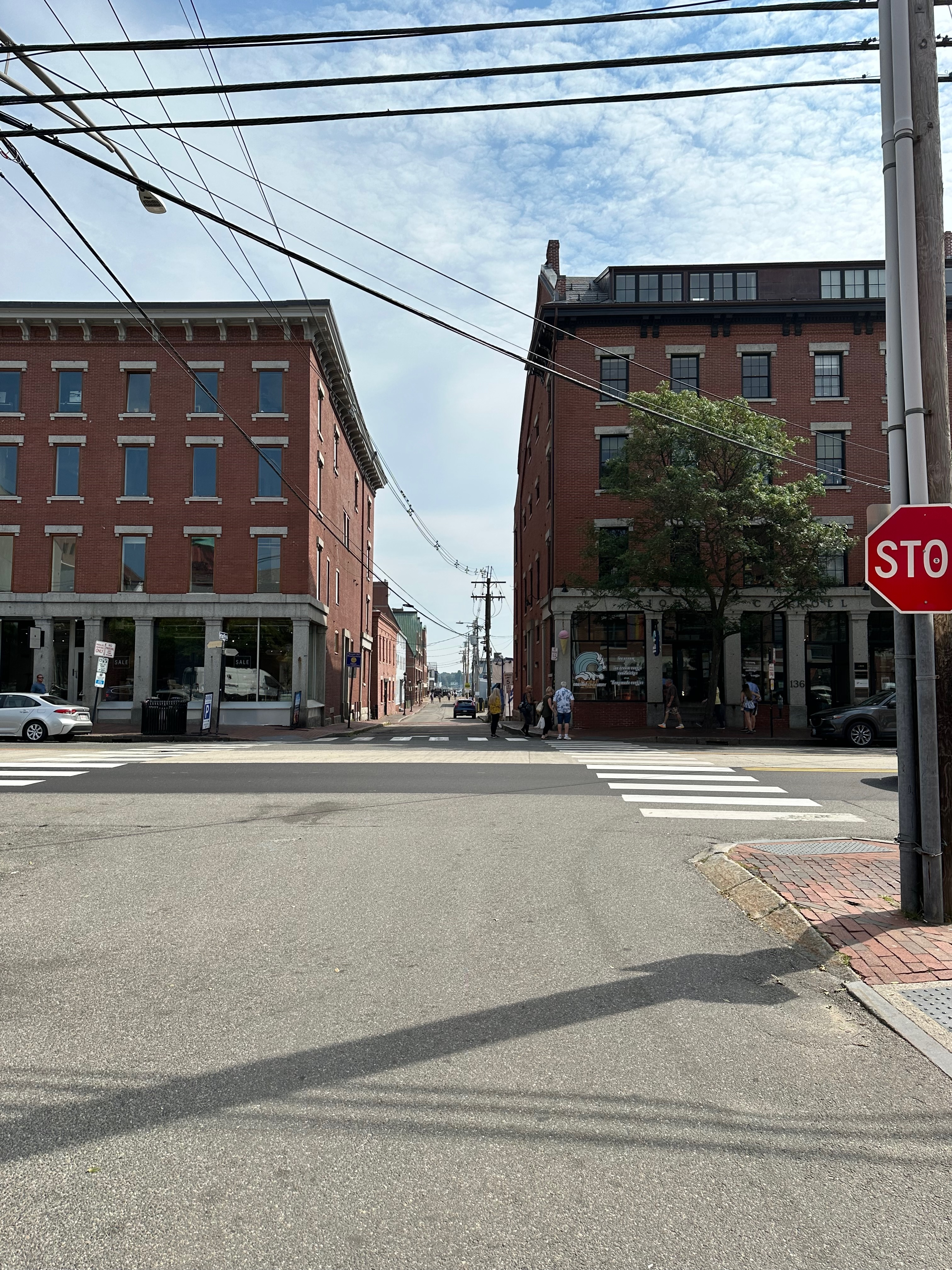
Each pier and wharf is located on the eastern side of Commercial Street. This view, of Portland Pier, is from Silver Street

- Maine State Pier (Franklin Street)
- Maine Wharf
- Custom House Wharf (formerly known as Verrier's Wharf; Pearl Street)
- Portland Pier (Silver Street)
- Long Wharf (formerly Pocahontas Wharf; between Market Street and Moulton Street)
- Chandler's Wharf (also known as Fisherman's Wharf, formerly Central Wharf; Dana Street, formerly known as Central Street)
- Widgery Wharf (formerly at the foot of Plum Street)
- Union Wharf (Union Street)
- Merrill's Wharf (formerly Dana's Wharf; Cross Street)
- Portland Fish Pier (Center Street)
- Wright Wharf (also known as A. R. Wright Company Coal Pier)
- Hobson's Wharf (formerly Sawyer's Wharf; High Street)
- Berlin Mills Wharf (High Street)
- Holyoke Wharf (formerly Dyer's Wharf; between High Street and Park Street)
- Sturdivant's Wharf (formerly Robinson's Wharf; Park Street)
- Deake's Wharf (between Park Street and State Street)

Wharves and piers that existed in the mid-19th century but have since been demolished include:

- Atlantic Railroad Wharf (India Street)
- Boston and Maine Railroad Wharf (between High Street and Maple Street)
- Brown's Wharf (Maple Street)
- Burnham's Wharf ("opens at Fore, foot of Deer")
- Ingraham Wharf (later Commercial Wharf; "foot of Lime Street")
- Franklin Wharf (Franklin Street)
- Gas House Wharf (Clark's Point)
- Isley Wharf (Emery Street)
- Merchant's Wharf (Centre Street)
- Railway Wharf ("next west of Atlantic")
- Railroad Wharf (State Street)
- Railroad Pier ("east of A & St L R R depot")
- Richardson's Wharf (Cross Street)
- Smith's Wharf (Maple Street)
- Smith's Pier (Maple Street)
- State Street Wharf (State Street)
- (Old) Sturdivant's Wharf (Thames Street)
- Tyler & Rice's Wharf (Clark's Point)

== See also ==
- 2024 Portland flood
- Portland Railroad Company
- Cassidy Point, at the western end of Commercial Street
