= Daniel Clement Colesworthy =

American poet

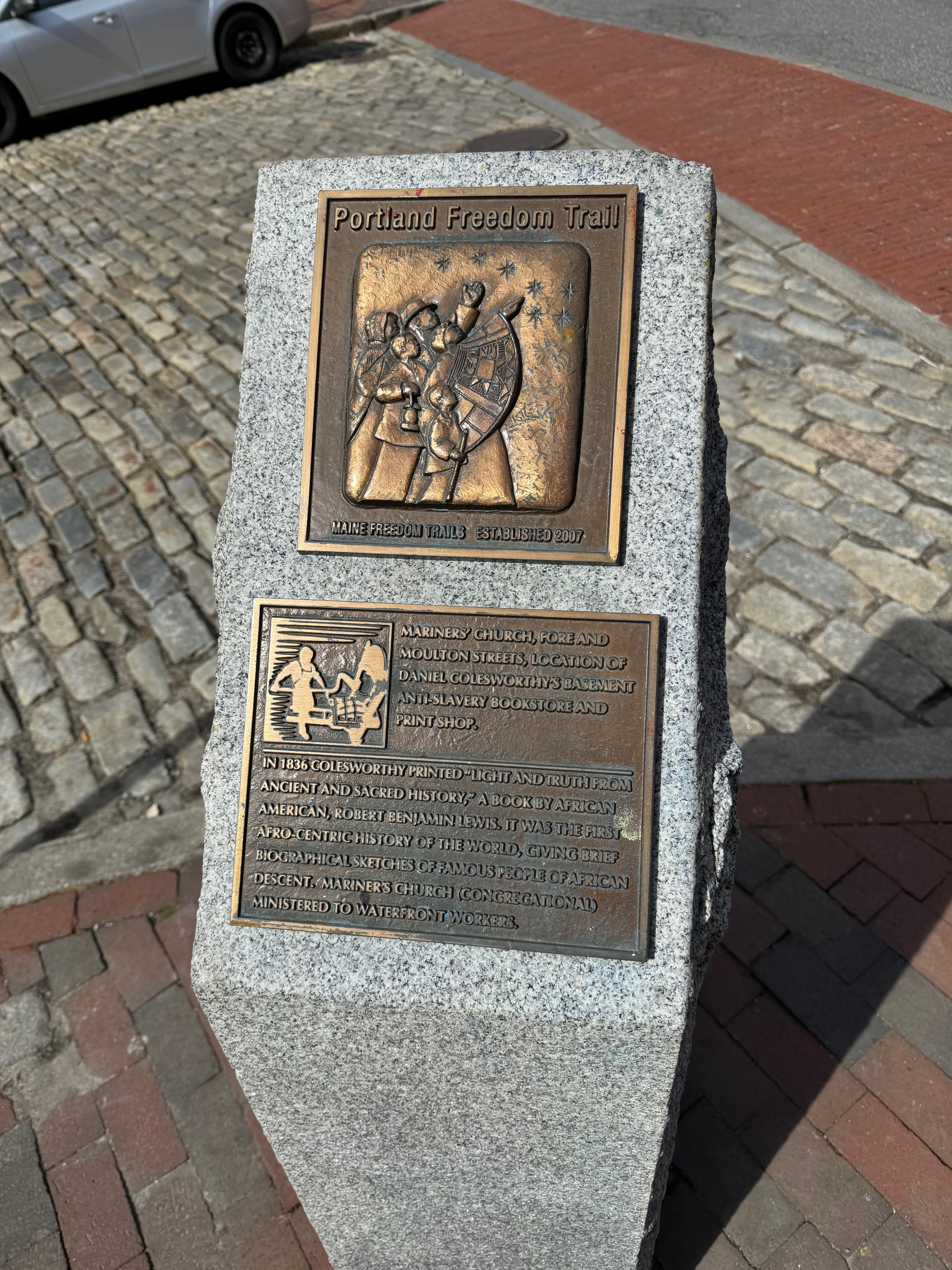
A marker on the Portland Freedom Trail referencing Colesworthy

Daniel Clement Colesworthy (14 July 1810 – 1 April 1893) was an American printer, bookseller, and poet.

== Early life ==
Colesworthy was born in Portland, Maine, in 1810, the second son of Daniel Pecker Colesworthy and Anna Collins. He became a printer, having served an apprenticeship in the office of Arthur Shirley, beginning at the age of 14. Early in his life, he became the editor and publisher of a young people's paper first known as The Sabbath School Instructor, and afterwards Moral Reformer, and Journal of Reform, which did not last many years.

== Career ==
In June 1840, Colesworthy commenced the publication of a small semi-monthly paper call The Youth's Monitor, which he continued for about two years. In 1841 he printed the first number of a weekly literary paper, the Portland Tribune, which he continued for four years and ten weeks, and in June, 1845, sold his interest in the paper to John Edwards, who was publisher of the Portland Bulletin. The two papers, becoming united, were called the Tribune and Bulletin.

Colesworthy kept a book store on Exchange Street, and for a while in the basement of the Mariner's Church, on the corner of Fore Street and Moulton Street.

He afterwards, and before 1851, moved to Boston and opened a bookstore on Cornhill. He was also proprietor of another store in the immediate vicinity, having his home in Chelsea.

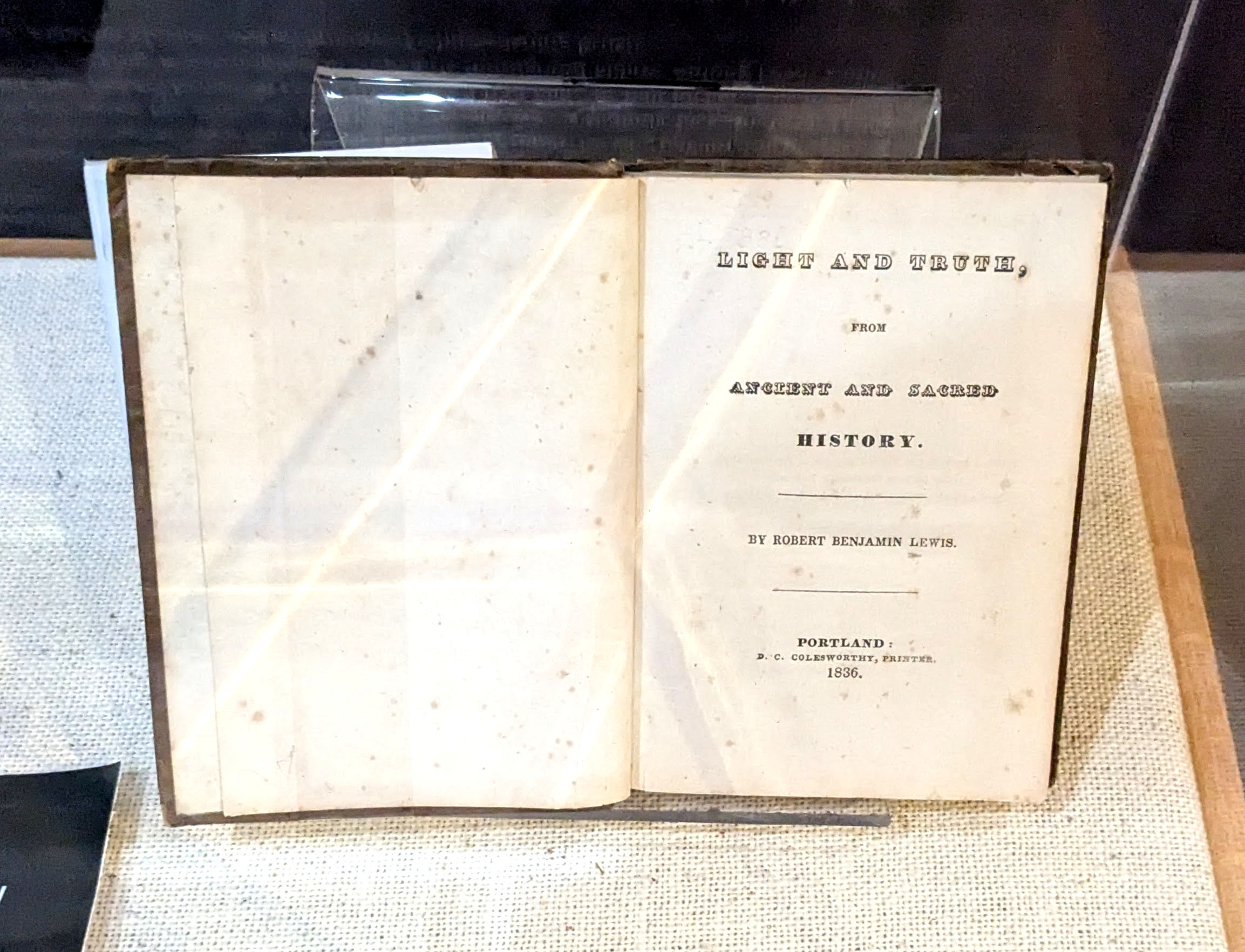
Inside a display case rests a first edition copy of the book Light and Truth by Robert Benjamin Lewis. It is open to the title page and displays the title, author, and the name of the publisher, Daniel Clement Colesworthy

=== Notable works ===
- One of several publishers of Little Things by Julia Abigail Fletcher Carney.
- Light and Truth by Robert Benjamin Lewis, the first "history book" about African Americans and Native Americans.

Colesworthy himself was a voluminous writer, both in prose and verse, seeking to instruct as well as amuse his readers. Among his publications are several volumes of poetry, including the following in order of publication: "The Opening Buds," "A Group of Children," "The Year," and "School is Out." The latter of these was published in 1876, with copious notes, that were valuable for their biographical and historical data. The following notable quotation is from this work.

Ay, soon upon the stage of life,

Sweet, happy children, you will rise,

To mingle in its care and strife,

Or early find the peaceful skies.

Then be it yours, while you pursue

The golden moments, quick to haste

Some noble work of love to do,

Nor suffer one bright hour to waste.

[School is Out]

== Personal life ==
Colesworthy's son, William Gibson Colesworthy (1851–1907), attended Harvard and Boston Universities, entered his father's business in 1877 and carried on his father's bookstore at 66 Cornhill until his own death in 1907.

== Death ==
Colesworthy died in 1893 at his home, on Chestnut Street in Chelsea, Massachusetts, aged 82. He was the oldest bookseller in the Boston area at the time.
