= Christiana Williams Freeman =

American activist

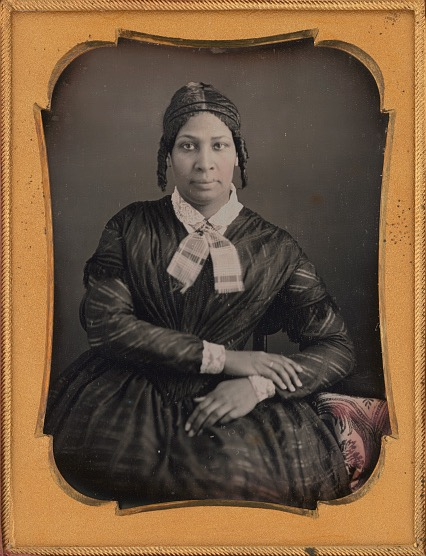
Christiana Williams Freeman (ca. 1855)

Christiana Taylor Livingston Williams Freeman (1812–1909) was an American seamstress and activist who helped slaves escape via the Underground Railroad. She was distantly related to Eleanor Roosevelt through her father.

== Life ==
Freeman was the daughter of Philip Henry Livingston, the grandson of Philip Livingston, who was a signer of the Declaration of Independence, and an enslaved woman named Barbara. The Livingston family was the second-largest slaveholding family in Columbia County, New York. Livingston was an ancestor of Eleanor Roosevelt and thus Freeman was a distant relative of Roosevelt.

According to the exhibit "Redefining the Family: The Livingstons and the Institution of Slavery in Early America" hosted by the Clermont State Historic Site, Barbara was transported from St. Mary, Jamaica, to New York in 1812. As both Livingston’s daughter and legal property, Freeman was separated from her mother at a young age and put to work by age five. Livingston manumitted Freeman when she turned 15, but New York State did not legally recognize her freedom until she was 25. She eventually moved to Brooklyn, then home to the largest free Black community in New York, and in 1839, married Amos Noë Freeman, a minister, educator, and abolitionist. The couple had five children, three of whom survived into adulthood. Christiana, a seamstress and humanitarian, was also an active participant in the Underground Railroad with her husband. In 1852, they moved to Portland, Maine, where Amos served for 11 years as pastor of the Abyssinian Meeting House. They later returned to Brooklyn, and she worked at the Colored Orphan Asylum. Amos died in 1893, and Christiana lived to the age of 97, dying in 1909.

Freeman’s story survived only through oral history within her family until 1996, when her great-great-great-grandson Christopher Rabb shared it publicly. During a Livingston family gathering, he gave a presentation and provided evidence confirming their lineage. Her story is the most detailed account of an enslaved person’s life in Columbia County that historians have been able to assemble.
