= Mexicali Blues =

Mexicali Blues may refer to:

- Mexicali Blues (company), an American company founded in 1988
- "Mexicali Blues" (song), a 1972 song by the Grateful Dead
