= Amos Noë Freeman =

American activist

Amos Noë Freeman (1809 —1893) was an African-American abolitionist, Presbyterian minister, and educator. He was the first full-time minister of Abyssinian Congregational Church in Portland, Maine, where he led a station on the Underground Railroad.

== Early life and education ==
Amos Noë Freeman was born in Rahway, New Jersey. He was orphaned and raised within the church from an early age. As a child, he was sent to attend the African Free School in Manhattan, then matriculated to Phoenix High School in New York City, established by his mentor Rev. Theodore Sedgewick Wright.

Freeman returned to his native New Jersey to attend Rahway Academy, and later transferred to the Oneida Institute in Whitesboro, New York. It had recently been founded by radical Presbyterian minister, Rev. Beriah Green. Freeman was one of four African Americans in the first year class of 33; others were Amos Beman, who became a good friend; Alexander Crummell, and Henry Highland Garnet. Upon graduating from Oneida Institute in the early 1830s, Freeman moved back to New Jersey, first to New Brunswick, then Newark, to teach in the "colored" public schools.

== Marriage and family ==
In 1839 in Newark, Freeman married Christiana Taylor Williams (1812–1903), born in Red Hook on Hudson, New York. She was a recently manumitted domestic slave and black descendant of Philip H. Livingston (1769, Jamaica-1831, New York), grandson of Philip Livingston, a signer of the Declaration of Independence; and Barbara Williams, an enslaved woman of African descent born in Jamaica. Christiana Williams had worked in one or more of Livingston's households in New York state.

The Freemans had a family, including a daughter, Mary Freeman. She married Rev. Robert Foster Wheeler. One of their daughters, Laura Wheeler Waring, became a portrait painter known for her work during the Harlem Renaissance. She was among the first African-American artists to have works exhibited by the Harmon Foundation, and was commissioned by them to do portraits of prominent African Americans.

== Ministry ==
Freeman was ordained as a minister by the New York Presbytery in 1840. In 1841, he and his wife moved to Portland, Maine, where he was installed as the first pastor of the Abyssinian Congregational Church, now the third oldest surviving black church in the United States. It became a center of the anti-slavery movement and part of the Underground Railroad. Freeman became the most well-known African American in Maine because of his leadership there; he was a strong supporter of education and also ran a school affiliated with the church. For a decade, he and his wife provided support to fugitive slaves at the church and in their home.

In 1852, Rev. Freeman became the pastor of Siloam Presbyterian Church in Brooklyn, New York, founded in 1849. He served there from 1852 to 1860. He was a longtime friend of Amos Gerry Beman, a prominent black minister active in the Northeast. In 1853, he was a prominent attendee of the radical abolitionist National African American Convention in Rochester, New York. His was one of 5 names attached to the address of the convention to the people of the United States published under the title, The Claims of Our Common Cause, along with Frederick Douglass, James Monroe Whitfield, Henry O. Wagoner, and George Boyer Vashon. In 1857 Freeman moderated the annual meeting of the Evangelical Association of Colored Ministers of Congregational and Presbyterian Churches, which met from 1856 to 1859 to confirm their distinctive vocation; that year they met at the Central Presbyterian Church in Philadelphia. In 1859 Freeman hosted this meeting at the Siloam Church, by which time there were 27 black churches in the group.

While Rev. Freeman lived in Brooklyn in the mid-1850s, he secretly sheltered and aided Anna Maria Weems, a young fugitive slave, on her journey to freedom in Canada. Jacob Bigelow, a Washington, DC lawyer, disguised her as a boy. They met Dr. Ellwood Harvey of Philadelphia in front of the White House in November 1855, and Weems pretended to be a male buggy driver. She drove Harvey from Washington to Philadelphia, where Harvey took her to the house of another abolitionist, William Still, for Thanksgiving. The next day Dr. Harvey took Weems across the river to Camden, New Jersey, and on to New York City. In Brooklyn he took her to Rev. Charles Ray's house. Ray took her to the home of Lewis Tappan, where the only photo of Weems was taken in her "boy disguise". Rev. Freeman accompanied Weems from there by train to Canada, where she reached safety at her uncle and aunt's house in Ontario. It is likely that is where Freeman first met the radical American abolitionist, John Brown. Later Brown stopped at Freeman's church in Brooklyn in 1859, while en route to his raid at Harpers Ferry.

== Later years ==
In 1860, Rev. Freeman was called as pastor of the Congregationalist Talcott Street Church in Hartford, Connecticut. Four years later, Rev. Freeman and family returned to Brooklyn, where he rejoined the congregation at Siloam Presbyterian Church. Freeman served there until his retirement in 1885. Christiana Williams Freeman worked at the Colored Orphans Home in New York City, where she helped protect the children during the New York Draft Riots of 1863. Rev. Freeman died at his home in Brooklyn. Both Freemans are buried at The Evergreen Cemetery in Brooklyn.

== Legacy and honors ==
- The "Home of Amos Noe and Christiana Williams Freeman" is on the Portland Freedom Trail in Maine, and a plaque was installed in their honor.

== See also ==
- Kings County Colored Mens Association
