= Long Wharf =

Long Wharf may refer to some locations in the United States:

- Long Wharf (Boston), Massachusetts (built 1710)
- Long Wharf, New Haven, Connecticut
- Oakland Long Wharf, California
- Long Wharf (Portland, Maine)
- Long Wharf (San Francisco), California
- Long Wharf (Santa Monica), California (historic, 1893–1933)

== See also ==
- Long Wharf Theatre, a nonprofit institution in New Haven, Connecticut
