= Moulton Street =

Downtown street in Portland, Maine

Coordinates: 43.656252°N 70.252846°W

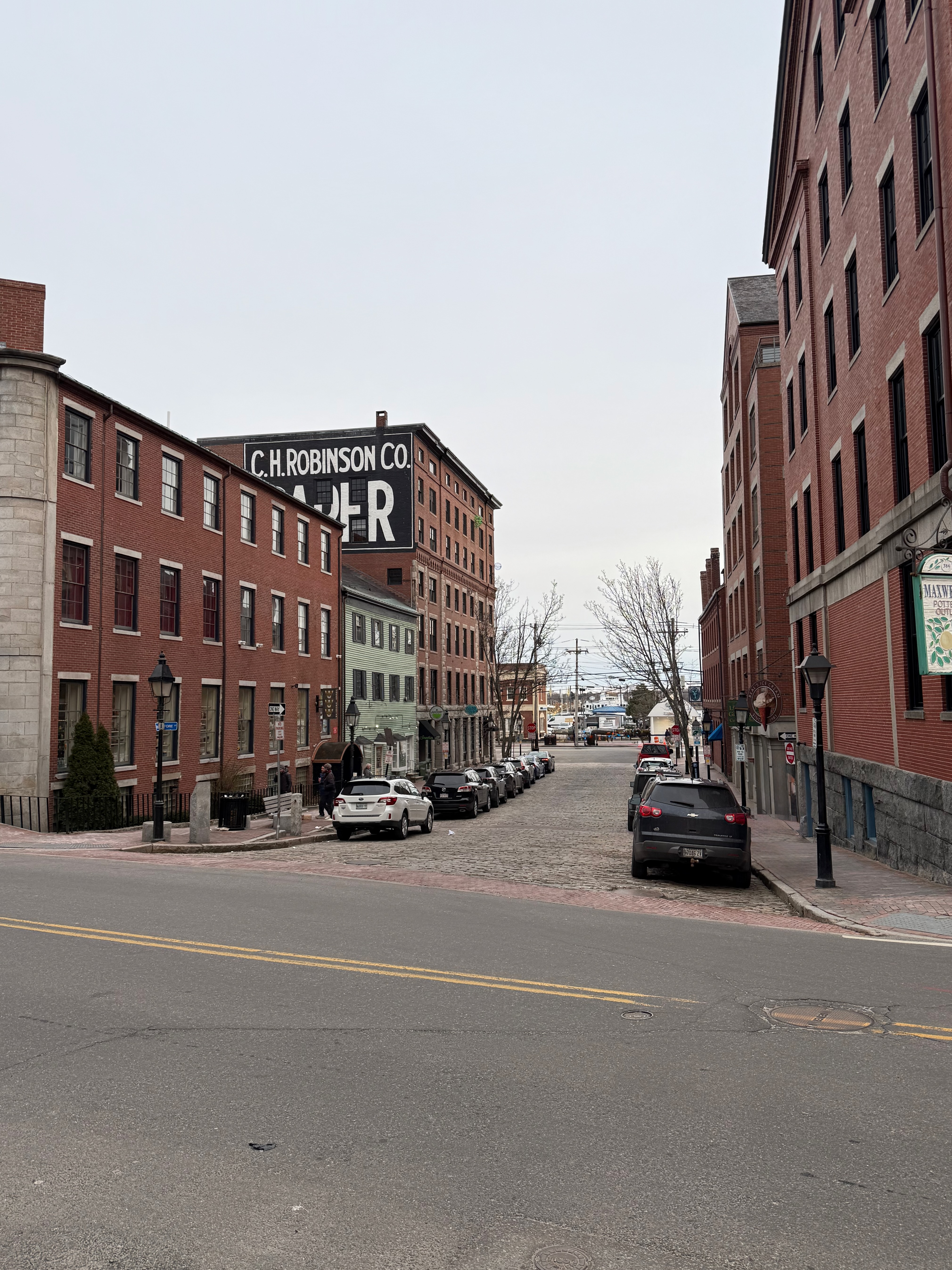
- A 2025 view, looking southeast from Fore Street
- Interactive map of Moulton Street
- Namesake: William H. Moulton
- Length: 0.044 mi (0.071 km)
- Location: Portland, Maine, U.S.
- Northwest end: Fore Street
- Southeast end: Commercial Street

Moulton Street is a historic downtown street in Portland, Maine, United States. Situated in the heart of the Old Port, it runs for around 233 feet (71 m), from Fore Street in the northwest to Commercial Street in the southeast. One-way from Fore Street, its surface is cobblestoned, with brick sidewalks. The street is named for William H. Moulton, president of the Cumberland Bank, which stood at the corner of Moulton and Commercial.

At the corner of Fore and Moulton is a Portland Freedom Trail marker for the anti-slavery bookstore and printshop run by Daniel Colesworthy. The Mariner's Church, built in 1828 in the Greek Revival style, stands at the northern corner of Fore and Moulton. It was listed on the National Register of Historic Places in 1973. C. H. Robinson, a paper company owned by Charles Henry Robinson (1839–after 1926), formerly occupied the entire block, including 9 Moulton Street, which became the home of Mexicali Blues for 28 years. Old Port Tavern occupied part of the Mariner's Church building between 1973 and 2022.

At the head of Moulton Street, 375 Fore Street was the home of Bull Feeney's, which closed in 2023 after 21 years in business.

Long Wharf, the home of DiMillo's Floating Restaurant, stands across Commercial Street from Moulton Street. Wharf Street, meanwhile, runs southwest from Moulton Street to Union Street, crossing Dana Street en route.

Moulton Street has been noted for its boutique stores.

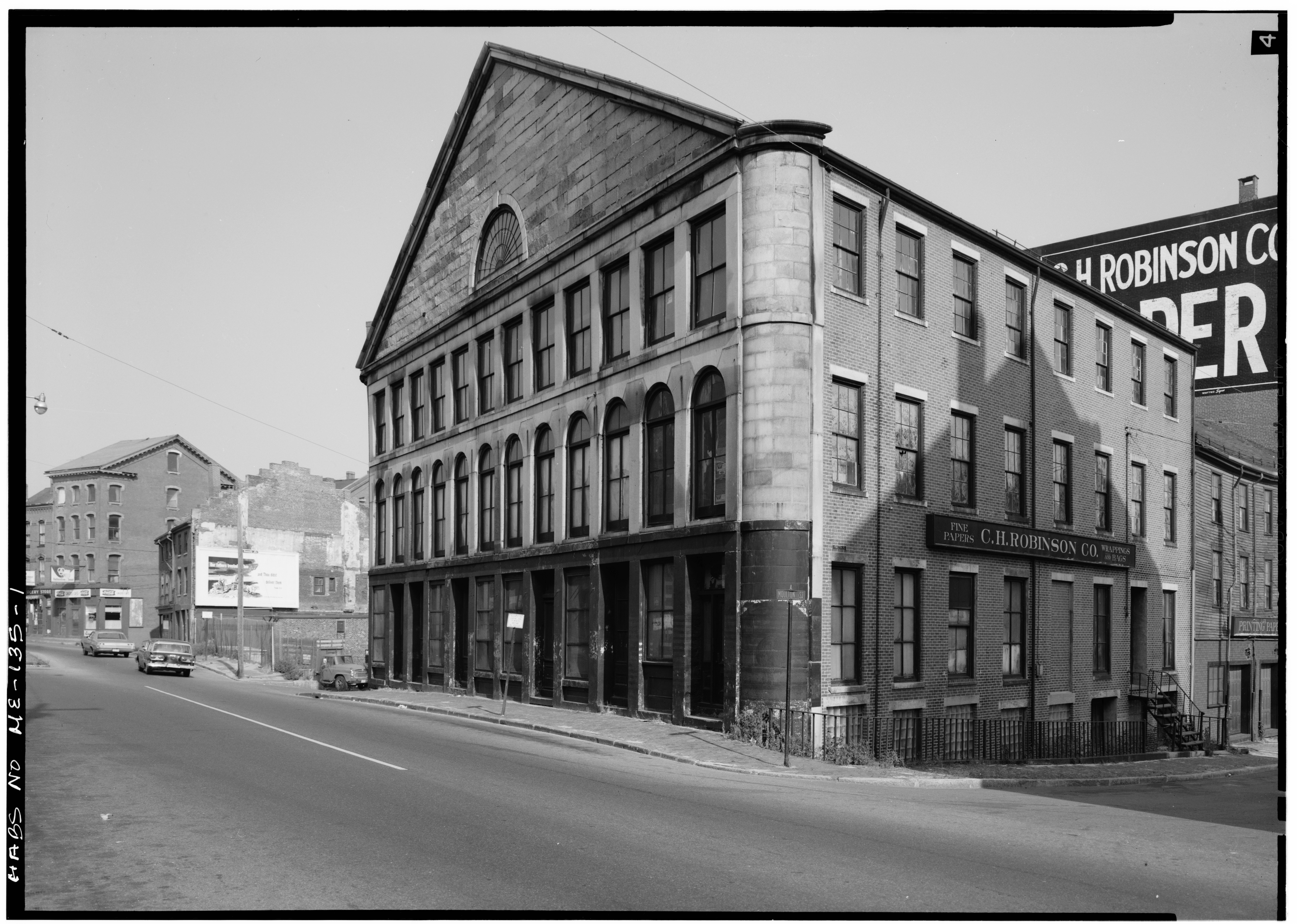
C. H. Robinson Company in the Mariner's Church, viewed from Fore Street (mid-20th century)

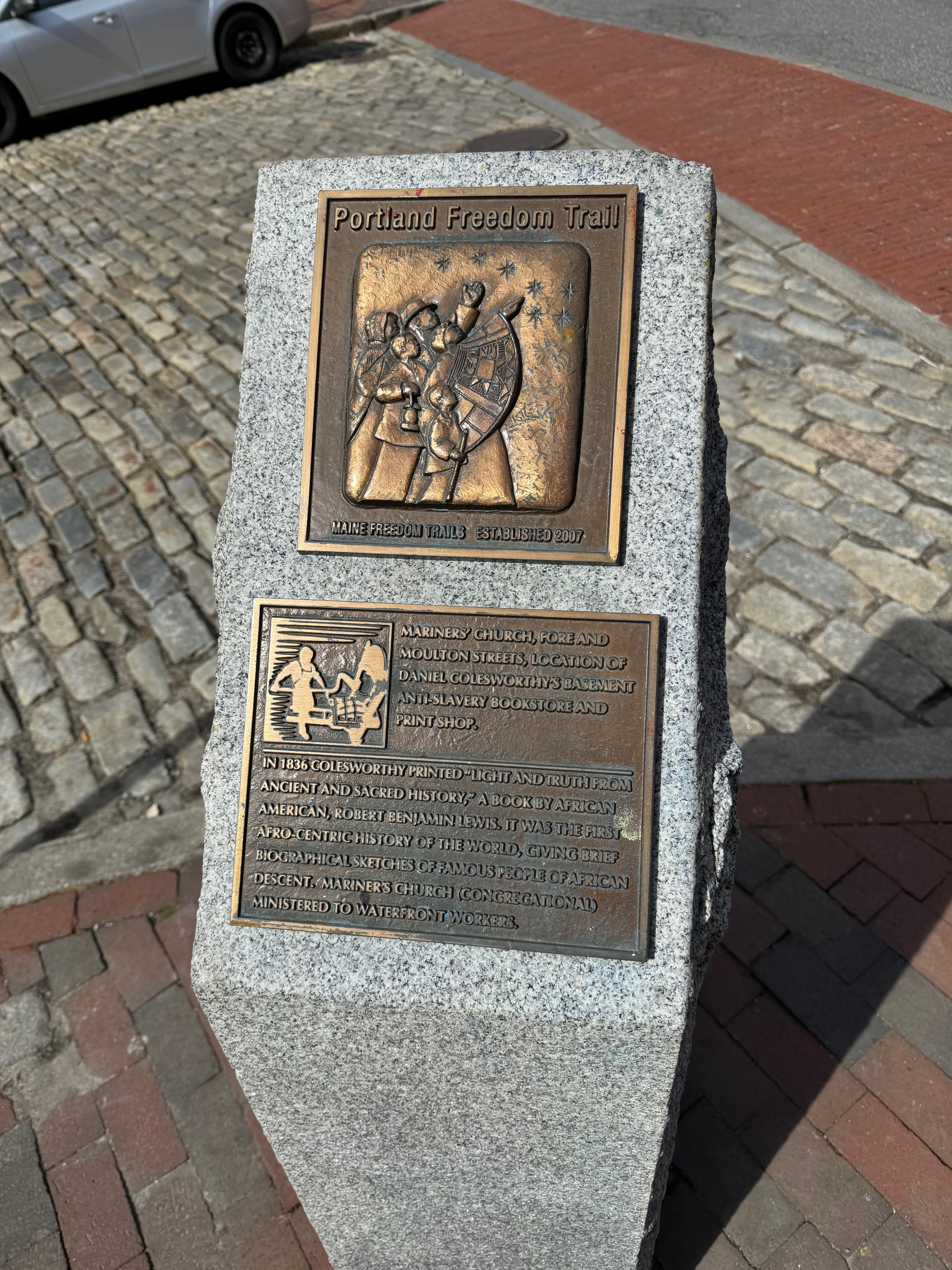
Portland Freedom Trail marker referencing Daniel Colesworthy

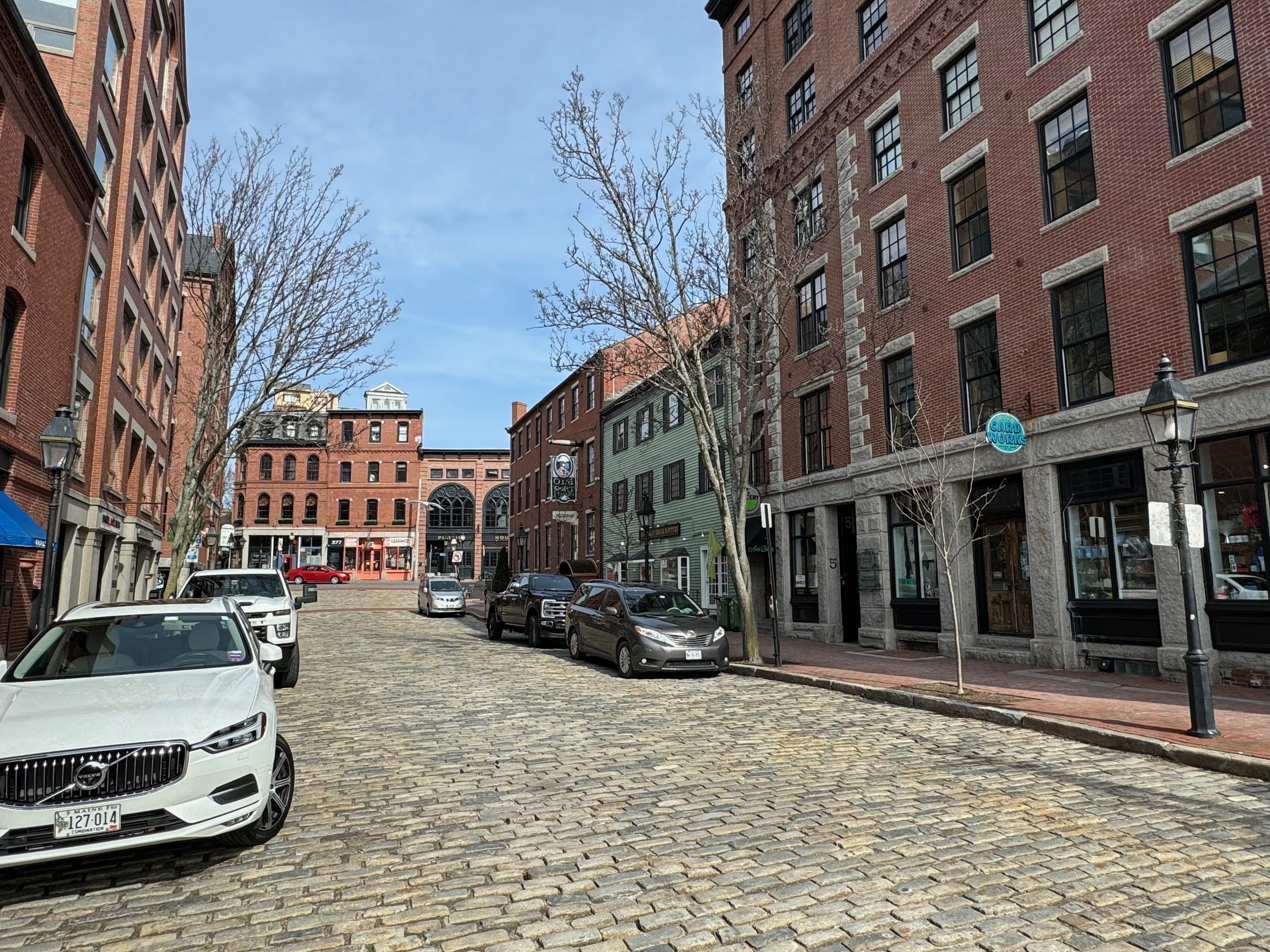
Looking northwest along Moulton Street from Commercial Street (2024)

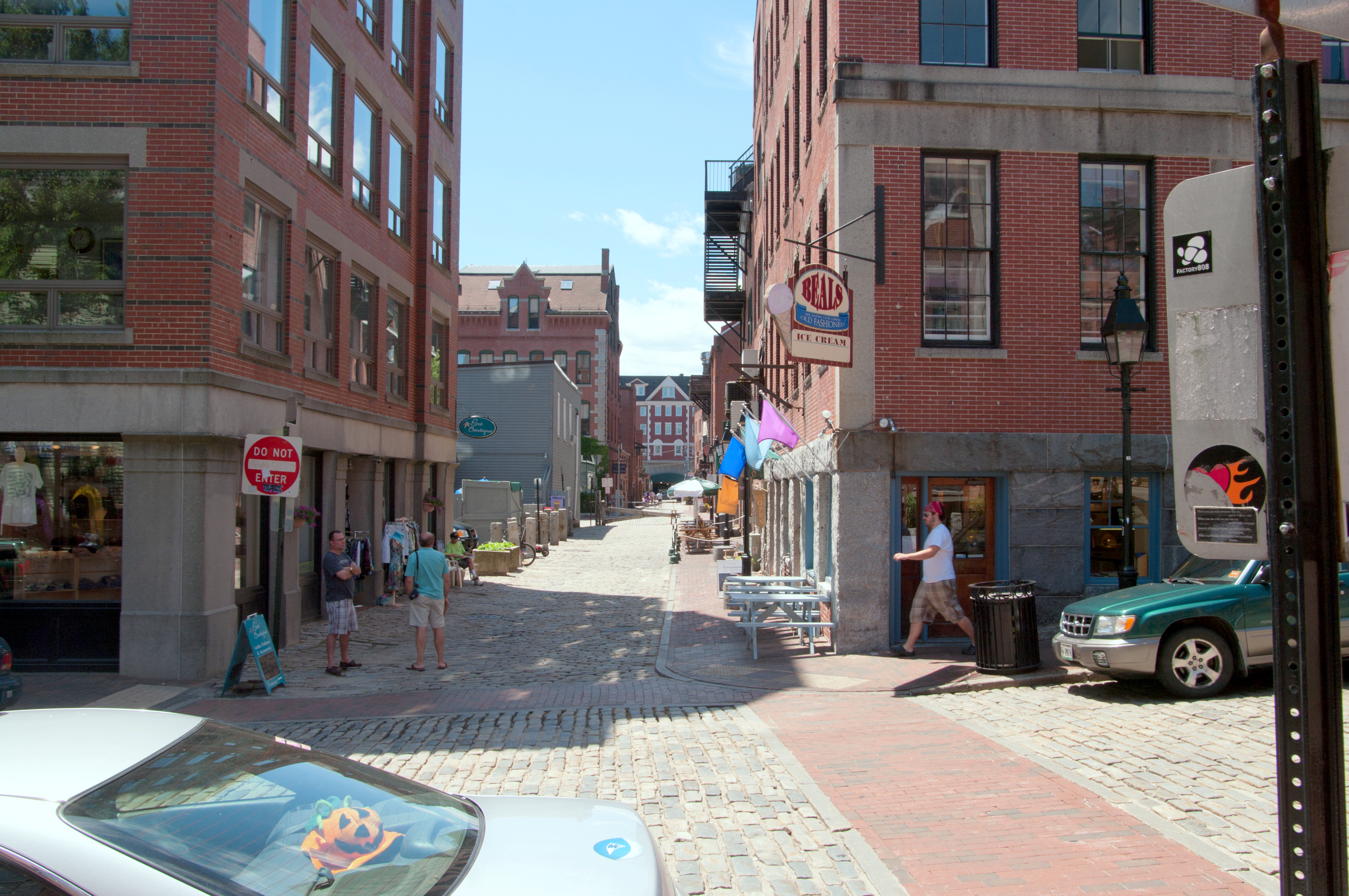
Wharf Street from Moulton Street (2012)
