= Reuben Ruby =

African-American businessman

Reuben Ruby (1798–1878) was an African-American businessman, hack driver, abolitionist, temperance supporter, and community leader. He was one of the leading Black figures in Maine politics during his lifetime and a founding member of the Abyssinian Meeting House, the third-oldest historical Black church in the United States.

== Family ==
Ruby was born in Gray, Maine, in 1798. His parents were Boston Ruby and Zeruiah Lewis. By 1820, he was living in Portland. He married Jannett C Pierre in 1821, who died in 1827. He then married Rachel Humphey in 1829, who died in 1861. He then married Ann M. Little in 1864. He lived at 81 Newbury Street in Portland, an address near the Abyssinian Meeting House.

His children were also important members of the Black community. William Wilberforce Ruby was a captain in the Portland Fire Company. He is credited as the first to spot the Great Fire of 1866 and he worked to keep the fire from burning the Abyssinian Meeting House, George Thompson Ruby, who was the first Black graduate of Portland High School, and a prominent black Republican leader in Reconstruction-era Texas, and Horatio Ruby was part of Naval expedition that led to the creation of the Panama Canal.

== Career ==
A longtime resident of Maine's largest city, Portland, Ruby was the state's first hack driver and hack stand owner. His hack stand operated at the Elm Tavern, which was located at the corner of Temple and Federal Streets in Portland's Old Port. A Portland Freedom Trail monument marks the location. It was through his hack business that he became involved in transporting people on the Underground Railroad. By the 1830s, he owned multiple carriages. In 1832, he drove William Lloyd Garrison around the city in his carriage during Garrison's visit to Portland. Afterwards, Garrison had dinner at Ruby's Portland home with other leaders of the African-American community.

Ruby also had various other professions besides hack driving. In 1820, Ruby was working in Portland as a waiter. In 1827, Ruby became a sales agent for Freedom's Journal, the first African-American owned and operated newspaper in the United States. Ruby went to California during the Gold Rush in 1848. He stayed four months and collected $3,000 worth of gold.

== Abyssinian Meeting House ==
Ruby and five other men wrote a letter published in the Eastern Argus newspaper in 1826 that condemned Portland churches for treating Black members as second-class citizens. The same men then petitioned the state to incorporate what would become the Abyssinian Meeting House.

== Political activism ==
Maine was one of the few states to grant voting rights to Black men. Maine gained statehood in 1820, and Ruby voted in Maine's first election at age 21. He joined the National Republican Party and then the Whigs.

In October 1834, he was one of four attendees from Portland at the founding convention of the Maine Anti-Slavery Convention, which led to the formation of the Maine Anti-Slavery Society that same year. In 1837, he served on the executive committee of the New England Temperance Convention, which was a convention of African-American supporters of temperance. In 1841, he helped form the Portland Union Anti-Slavery Society.

== Death ==
Ruby died in 1878, aged 78 or 79. He is interred in Forest City Cemetery in South Portland, Maine.
