= Julia Abigail Fletcher Carney =

American poet

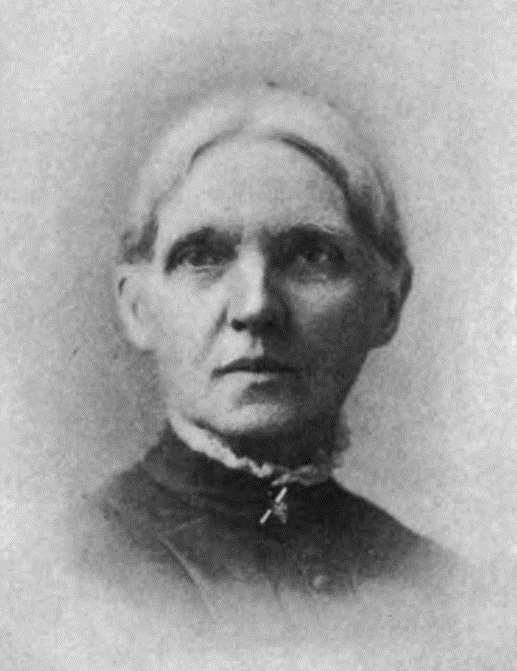
- Born: Julia Abigail Fletcher; April 6, 1823; Lancaster, Massachusetts, U.S.
- Died: November 1, 1908 (aged 85)
- Occupations: educator, poet, author, editor
- Spouse: Thomas J. Carney (m. 1849)
- Children: 8
- Writing career
- Pen name: "Julia", "Minnie May," "Frank Fisher," "Sadie Sensible," "Minister's Wife", "Rev. Peter Benson's Daughter"
- Language: English
- Notable work: "Little Things"

Julia Abigail Fletcher Carney (pen names, Julia, Minnie May, Frank Fisher, Sadie Sensible, Minister's Wife, Rev. Peter Benson's Daughter; April 6, 1823 – November 1, 1908) was an American educator, poet, author, and editor. Remembered for her poem "Little Things", many of her poems were set to music and published in school textbooks, and used in church hymn-books for more than half a century. She died November 1, 1908, in Galesburg, Illinois.

Carney had charge of the "Poet's Corner" in the Boston Trumpet. She furnished articles, both prose and verse, for the Christian Freeman when it was established. Something by her appeared in almost every number of the Rose of Sharon, and also in the Lily of the Valley. In the Universalist Miscellany, her articles bore the pen name of "Rev. Peter Benson's Daughter". In 1840, she commenced writing for the Ladies' Repository, under the signature of "Julia." She was a regular contributor to the Boston Olive Branch. She also wrote two volumes, published by J. M. Usher, entitled Gifts from Julia, and a series of Sunday school question books. Poetry of the Seasons was published by Abel Tompkins.

== Early years and education ==
Julia Abigail Fletcher was born April 6, 1823, in Lancaster, Massachusetts. She inherited patriotism from Revolutionary ancestors, being a granddaughter of Major Timothy Fletcher, of Lancaster, Massachusetts, and of Major Moses Warren, of Jay, Maine. She had no recollection of a time when she did not express her thoughts in verse. Her older brothers and sister were happy to write down her rhymes many years before she learned to do it herself. Her earliest sorrow was the opinion of a maiden aunt, freely expressed to her mother, that "if she let that child go on writing verses, she would never be good for anything else." This advice led to a maternal injunction, "Never let me see any more of your poetry." Subsequently, the mother found her daughter's rhymes hidden in the attic and repealed the injunction.

Several years of invalidism, the result of scarlet fever at the age of eight years, interfered with her education, but from her couch, she read through the libraries of the neighborhood. Her first works of verse were published in the Lancaster and Concord local papers at the age of fourteen. Educated at Lancaster Academy, her school compositions, chiefly in verse, were sent regularly to several papers and magazines in Boston, whose editors were pleased with the youthful effusions, and constantly encouraged her to write.

== Career ==
When seventeen, she went to Philadelphia, where her married sister resided, and there remained two years, teaching in a private school. Returning to Massachusetts to the home of her parents, she served a summer's apprenticeship in the district school, where she attracted commendation from the committee by keeping a formerly unruly school in good order without corporal punishment. During her life as a teacher, she wrote many poems and sketches, most of them for radical papers with reform ideas, and also a series of Sunday school instruction books, which were used for many years in liberal churches, until Lesson Papers superseded the use of textbooks. In 1844, she was elected teacher of one of the primary schools in Boston, where she continued to teach until her marriage in the spring of 1849.

From 1849, her writing was chiefly prose, and for the Phrenological Journal, Science of Health, Midland Monthly, and our various denominational papers, especially the New Covenant. In 1869 and 1870, she conducted the "Home and Fireside" department of the New York National Agriculturist, and the Bee-Keepers′ Journal. As she was expected to fill several columns with continued novelties, she surprised her readers with a variety of signatures, including: "Minnie May," "Frank Fisher," "Sadie Sensible," and "Minister's Wife". Her signature of "Julia," however, though known to her friends, was usually dropped by those who copied her articles, and so it happened that those finding favor with the public went the rounds of paper, magazine, and schoolbook, many of them in the books from which she herself taught, without credit, some of them marked "Anon." As a writer, using too many signatures became a serious mistake, not only taking parts of her real name, sometimes her husband's, but fictitious ones. This was done, partly to give variety, when under engagement to fill a certain number of columns of "Home and Fireside" department in a New York City monthly, and partly as a minister's wife, who wanted to criticise the relations of pastor and people without giving offense.

She was deeply interested in the reform movements of the time, and often wrote on their behalf. She was also actively engaged in Sunday school work, and was well known as a writer for children. In later life, she wrote chiefly in prose, short sketches of real life, or essays upon temperance, and other serious subjects.

== Personal life ==
In 1849, she married Rev. Thomas J. Carney (1818–1871), a Universalist minister. After a year's residence in Maine, and another in Cooperstown, New York, they took up their home in the West. Here, amid the many duties of pioneer life, and the care of little children, she seldom had time for writing.

In 1871, the family had removed to Apple Creek Prairie, Illinois where the people had commenced a church under his ministry. He left home on horseback, and was returning to observe their wedding anniversary, when he was thrown from his horse. At first, it was supposed the injury would detain him at home for a few weeks, and he was sure of a speedy recovery; but soon, the lesion of a vein in his back caused unconsciousness from which he never recovered. He died May 4, 1871, and was buried at White Hall, Illinois. The widow was still in mourning when her son William, age 20, died suddenly of sunstroke. Four other children had died in infancy, leaving one daughter and three sons still with her. She moved in with her oldest son, Fletcher Carney, an attorney of Galesburg, Illinois, but made frequent visits to her younger son, Rev. James W. Carney, of Holyoke, Massachusetts.

== Selected works ==
- A Journal of Julia Abigail Fletcher : commenced April 6th, 1846
- Description of writing of "Little drops of water."
- Gifts from Julia
- Poetry of the Seasons
