= Green Memorial A.M.E. Zion Church =

Historic church in Maine

- U.S. National Register of Historic Places
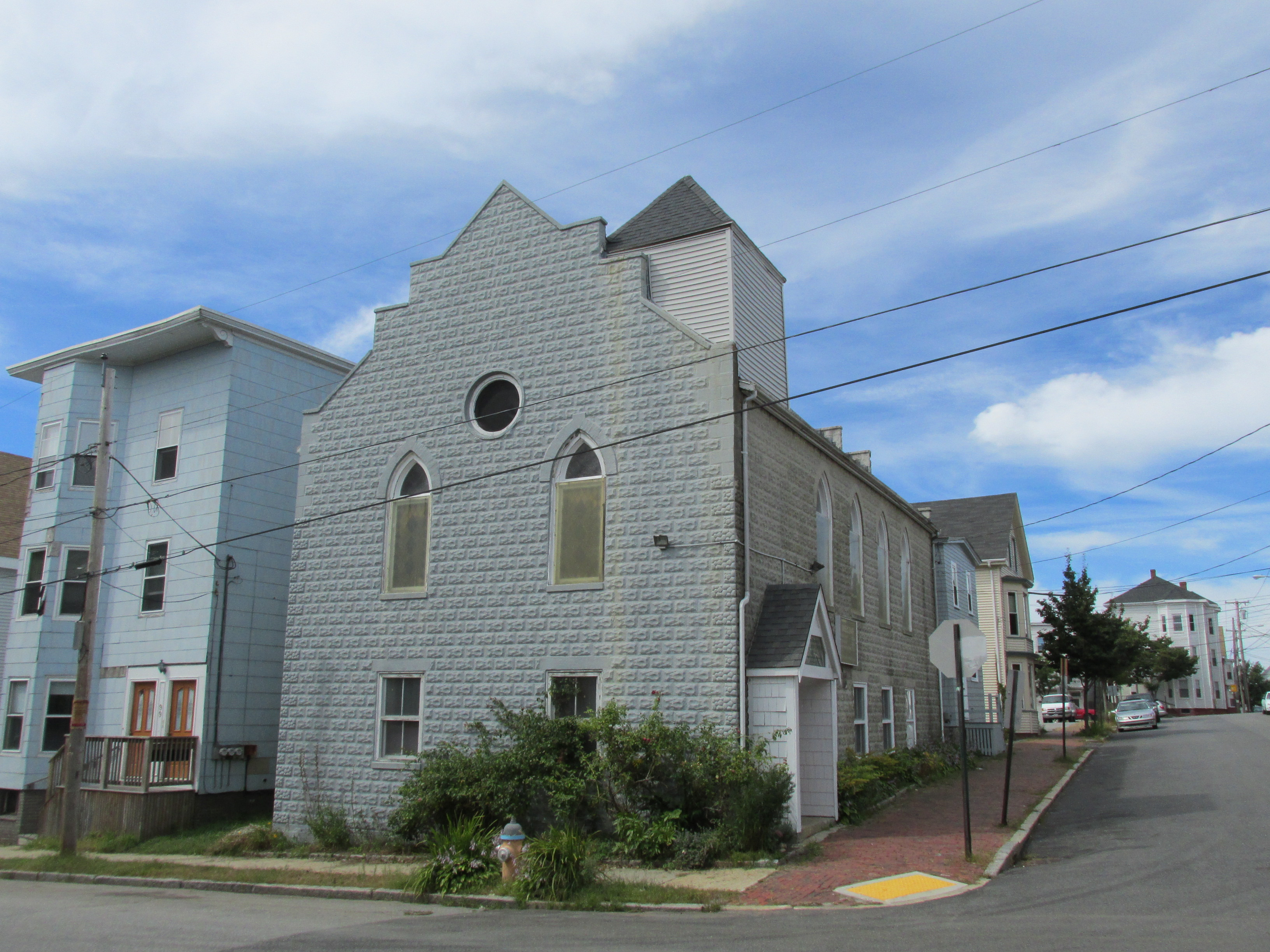
- Green Memorial A.M.E. Zion Church

- Location within Maine Location within the United States
- Location: 46 Sheridan St., Portland, Maine, U.S.
- Coordinates: 43°39′50″N 70°14′58″W
- Area: less than one acre
- Built: 1914
- NRHP reference No.: 73000115
- Added to NRHP: January 17, 1973

The Green Memorial A.M.E. Zion Church is a historic church at 46 Sheridan Street in Portland, Maine, United States. It is a 2 1/2-story structure of textured concrete block masonry built in 1914 to house the congregation founded in 1891. The church is named after founder Moses Samuel Green, who was the city's wealthiest African American at the time. In the middle of the 20th century, the church was the focal point of the Portland's African American community. It hosted social events and was used to organize for civil rights advancements in Maine and across the United States.

The church choir has performed throughout Maine. The building was listed on the National Register of Historic Places in 1973 and later recognized as one of three historic properties in Maine directly related to African American history. Reverend Kenneth I. Lewis has been minister since 2003. In 2015, the multiracial congregation numbered 335.

== Description ==
The Green Memorial A.M.E. Zion Church is located in Portland's eastern Munjoy Hill neighborhood at the corner of Sheridan and Monument streets. It is a 2 1/2-story masonry structure, built out of concrete blocks and finished with a rough textured exterior. The building corners are partially quoined with smooth blocks. The first floor windows are rectangular sash. The second floor features Gothic lancet windows of stained glass. The entrance is near the street corner, sheltered by an open gable roof wood frame vestibule; a short wood frame tower rises through the roof above.

== History ==
=== Background and founding ===
Moses Samuel Green was born into slavery in 1852 and moved from Maryland to Portland the day after Union Station opened in 1888. He opened a shoeshine stand, invested in real estate, and became the city's wealthiest African-American citizen. Maine historian Bob Greene estimates he may have also been the wealthiest African American statewide. In 1891, Green collaborated with other African American Portlanders to found the A.M.E. Zion Mission. The mission used space in the Mount Zion A.M.E. Church at 63 Mountfort Street, which had existed under multiple names at multiple locations since 1850. In 1907, Green and the trustees purchased the lot at 46 Sheridan Street, where the A.M.E. Zion Church was built in 1914. The attached parsonage was completed in 1924; it was converted into an office when an offsite parsonage was purchased in 1973. Green died in 1942; the following year the congregation renamed the church in his honor.

The Congregational Abyssinian Meeting House closed in 1917 and many of its former members joined the A.M.E. Zion congregation. The Abyssinian's assets were transferred to the Congregational Conferences and Missionary Society of Maine, who transferred them to Green Memorial in 1947. This financial connection led Maine's State Historic Preservation Office to mistakenly claim Green Memorial as the Abyssinian's "descendent organization" on the Green Memorial's 1972 nomination to the National Register of Historic Places.

=== Mid-20th century ===
At the time Green Memorial was built, Portland's African American population lived mostly west of downtown near Union Station and east of downtown near the church. By the middle of the century, historian Justus Hillebrand wrote the church was "connected with almost all activities going on in the black community". The church kept a bulletin board for exchanging information about job opportunities with employers open to employing African Americans. Some church activities were organized by the all-woman Mis-Ter-Ray Club, which was founded in 1923 to organize tea parties, dances, and other social events, primarily to raise funds for the church. The church also brought African American musicians like Roland Hayes and Marian Anderson to perform in Portland. African Americans across Maine gathered annually on Independence Day, first in Old Orchard Beach in the 1920s, then Scarborough by the 30s, then later Sebago Lake. A bus from Green Memorial provided transportation from Portland for families who couldn't drive themselves.

The church began hosting monthly chicken dinners, starting 1921. Members of the congregation sold tickets to people in the Portland area to raise funds for the church. One organizer was known for selling bundles of tickets to area employers and city hall department heads, who would distribute them individually to employees. Many in the congregation were domestic workers, and these dinners were held on Thursdays to correspond with the day they typically did not work.

Historian Charles L. Lumpkins wrote the church "provided an institutional foundation for civil-rights activity in the area". The church hosted meetings and minister John Bruce traveled to the March on Washington for Jobs and Freedom. The church's ninth minister, Reverend Stephen Gill Spottswood, volunteered for the NAACP and joined their campaign to pressure Maine's senators to vote for the 1918 Dyer Anti-Lynching Bill. While president of the Washington, D.C., chapter in the 1940s, Spottswood led the campaign to desegregate that city's schools and public accommodations. He became national chair by 1961, but reconnected with Green Memorial as presiding bishop for the A.M.E.Z. New England Conference between 1964 and 1072.

=== Late 20th century to present ===
The church was listed on the National Register of Historic Places in 1973. By 1994, it was one of three National Register listings in Maine directly relevant to African American history. That year, after publishing a newspaper series on Portland African American history, journalist Shoshana Hoose collaborated with Karine Odine in 1994 to co-produce Anchor of the Soul, a documentary film on the topic. The word "anchor" in the title refers to the church's role in anchoring Portland's African American community in the 20th century.

Reverend Margaret Lawson became minister of the church in 1993. She was a gospel singer and directed choir groups for community events during her tenure. In 2000, Edward Wilmot Blyden's great-grandson Eluem Blyden, from West Africa, led the building of a traditional African canoe on church property. The event corresponded with a sailing event in adjacent Casco Bay. Lawson left the church in 2003 as its longest-serving minister.

Reverend Kenneth I. Lewis became minister in 2003 and subsequently became the director of the MaineHealth Center for Tobacco Independence, a member of the City of Portland Police Citizens Review Subcommittee, a member of the Portland Community Development Block Grant Allocation Committee, and Diversity Cabinet Chair and board member of the United Way of Greater Portland. In 2020, Governor Janet Mills appointed Lewis to the statewide Permanent Commission on the Status of Racial, Indigenous and Maine Tribal Populations as a faith-based community representative. The commission is tasked with identifying solutions to racial disparities in Maine.

In 2015, Green Memorial's congregation numbered 335, about 60 percent of whom were African American. In 2018, Lewis, describing the multiracial nature of the modern congregation, said, "For years the statement was made that Sunday is the most segregated day in the United States. But not at the corner of Monument and Sheridan."

== Choir ==
The congregation is noted for its choir. In 1998, the choir and the Williams Temple Church of God in Christ choir formed the Maine Gospel Choir and performed The Movement, Revisited at Bates College, a musical about the civil rights movement of the 1960s. In 2015, the choir performed at a multifaith memorial service held at Merrill Auditorium for those killed in the Charleston church shooting. Lewis organized the memorial. More than 1,300 people attended.

== See also ==
- National Register of Historic Places listings in Portland, Maine
