= Widgery Wharf =

Historic wharf in Portland, Maine, USA

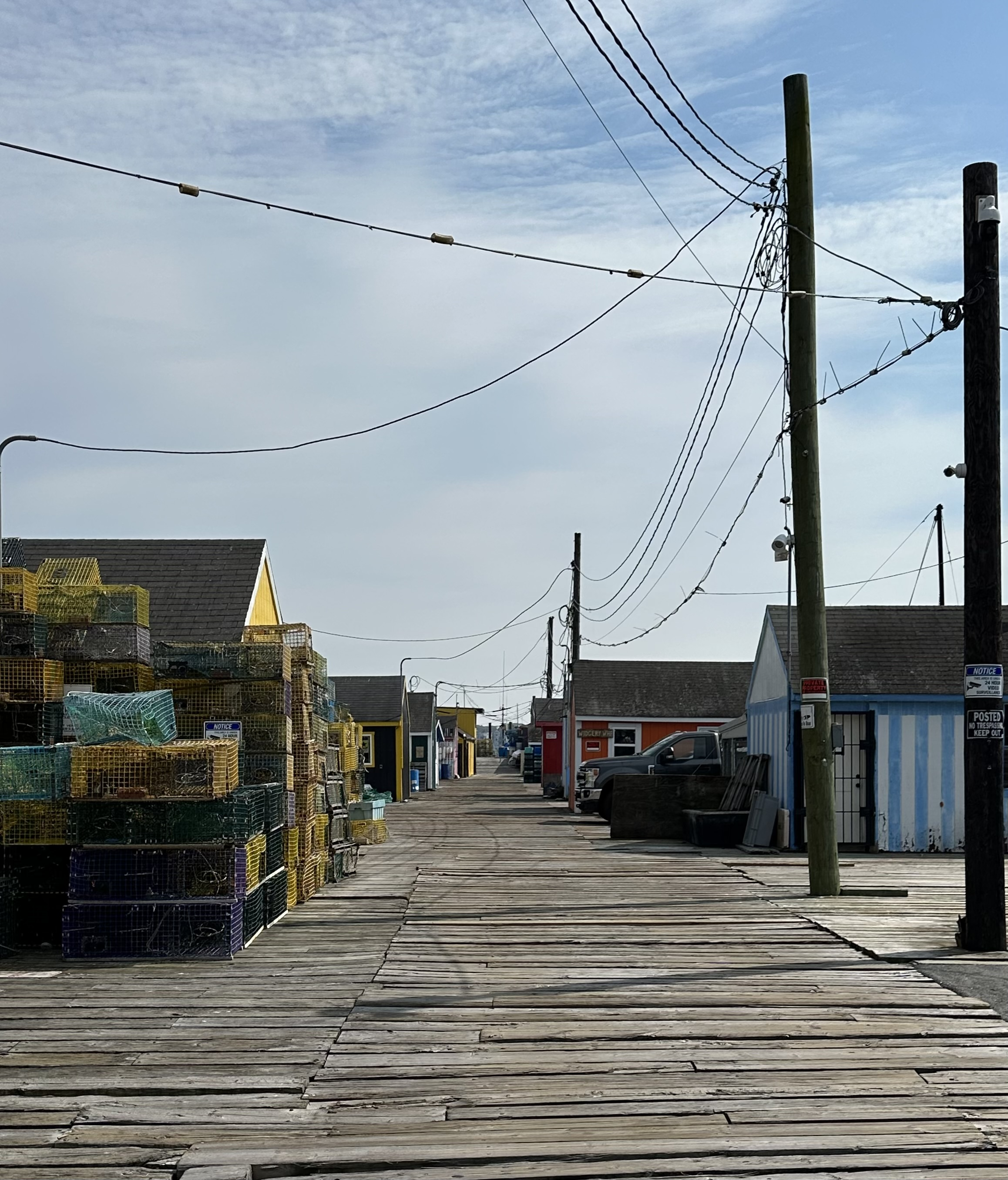
- Widgery Wharf (2023)
- Interactive map of Widgery Wharf
- Location: Commercial Street, Portland, Maine, U.S.
- Coordinates: 43.6544°N 70.2529°W

Widgery Wharf (also Widgery's Wharf) is a historic wharf in Portland, Maine, on the edge of the Fore River. Built in the late 1700s, across Commercial Street from the now-demolished Plum Street, the wharf is named for the Widgery family which controlled the local molasses trade at the time of completion. Members of the Widgery family include Congressman William Widgery. The precise date of the wharf's construction is unknown, with possible years including 1760, 1774 and 1777.

Much of the wharf was covered during the laying of Commercial Street in the 1850s. Despite this, it is one of the oldest standing structures in Portland. Adjacent (to the south) Union Wharf was completed in 1793, and today shares the same parking area as Widgery Wharf. Chandler's Wharf bounds it to the north.
