= Chandler's Wharf =

Historic wharf in Portland, Maine, U.S.

Coordinates: 43°39′17″N 70°15′08″W

- Fisherman's Wharf
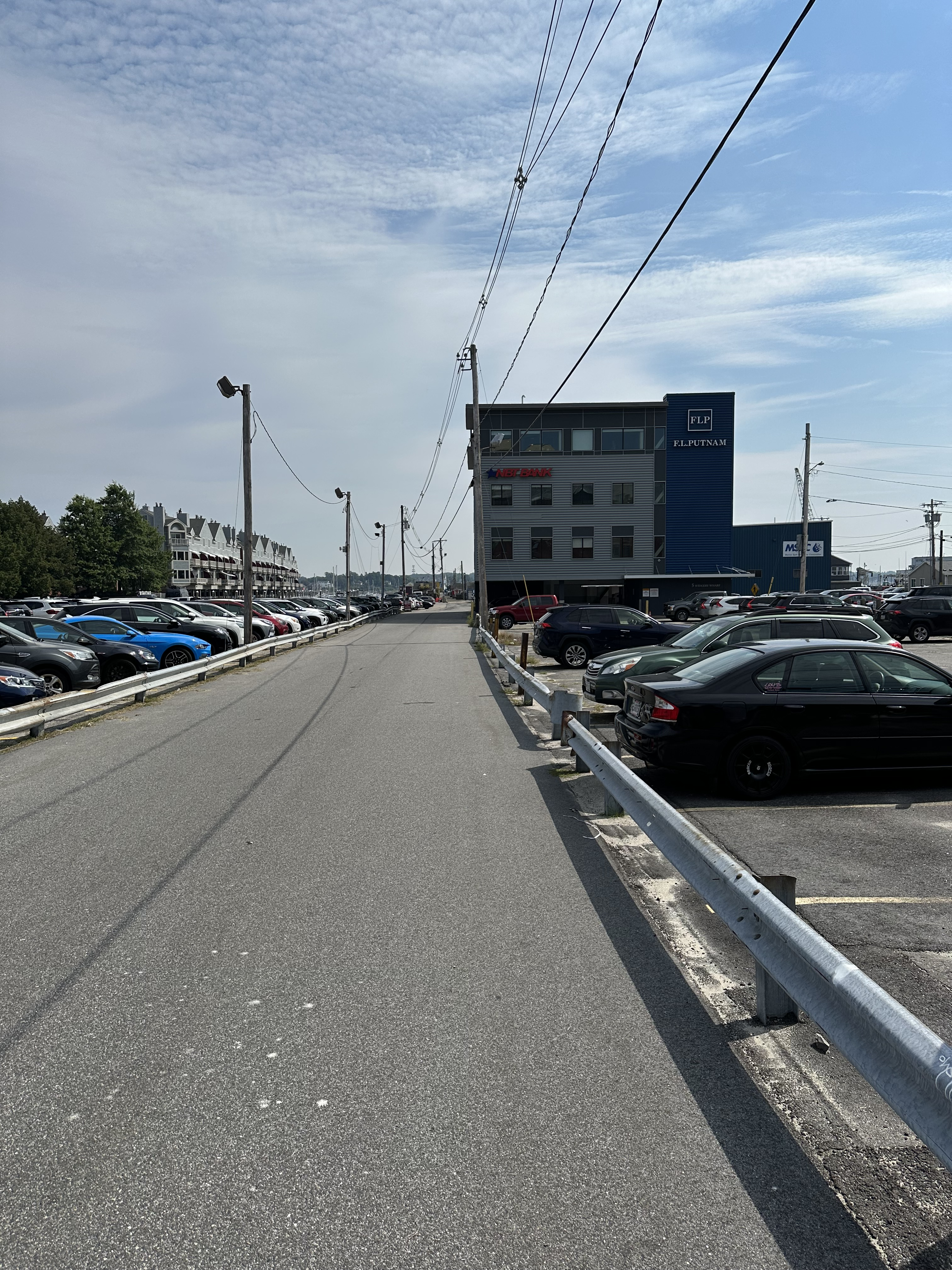
- Chandler's Wharf (2023)
- Former name: Central Wharf
- Location: Commercial Street, Portland, Maine, U.S.

Chandler's Wharf (also known as Fisherman's Wharf; formerly known as Central Wharf) is a historic wharf in Portland, Maine, on the edge of the Fore River. It stands across Commercial Street from Dana Street and, on the waterfront side, between Long Wharf (to the north) and Widgery Wharf (to the south).

The wharf, which is named for John Chandler, is now home to condominiums and businesses.

== See also ==
- 2024 Portland flood
