= Little Things (poem) =

19th century poem written by Julia Carney in Boston, Massachusetts

"Little Things" is a 19th-century poem by Julia Abigail Fletcher Carney, written in Boston, Massachusetts.

Little Things

Little drops of water,
Little grains of sand,
Make the mighty ocean
And the pleasant land.

Thus the little minutes,
Humble though they be,
Make the mighty ages
Of eternity.

== History ==
In 1845, when studying phonography in Stephen Pearl Andrews' and Augustus F. Boyle's class, Boston, Carney was asked to give an impromptu exercise on the blackboard. Only ten minutes were allowed, and in that time, she wrote the first verse of "Little Things". It became a favorite of children in Sunday school exhibitions from that time on, and was recited and sung thousands of times. It was first published in a Sunday school paper, Gospel Teacher (renamed, Myrtle). (Note: For different accounts of the publishing history of this poem, see Gardner's, Famous Poems from Bygone Days.)

Soon after her phonographic poem was published, it appeared in the Methodist Sunday-School Advocate, with an additional verse about missionary pennies, to which she laid no claim.

This poem came to be published uncredited as a children's rhyme and hymn in many 19th century magazines and books, sometimes attributed to Ebenezer Cobham Brewer, Daniel Clement Colesworthy, or Frances Sargent Osgood, but the earliest publications of it clearly are those of Carney. (Note: See E. R. Hanson in Our Woman Workers: Biographical Sketches of Women Eminent in the Universalist Church for Literary, Philanthropic and Christian Work (1881), as well as Familiar Quotations 9th edition (1906) edited by John Bartlett, The Oxford Dictionary of Quotations (1999) by Elizabeth Knowles and Angela Partington, and The Yale Book of Quotations (2006), ed. Fred R. Shapiro.) A later final verse read:

Little deeds of kindness,
Little words of love,
Make our pleasant earth below
Like the heaven above.

This was quoted in Hanson's Our Woman Workers: Biographical Sketches of Women Eminent in the Universalist Church for Literary, Philanthropic and Christian Work (1881) These were the final words of the poem in the original publication, but later versions published anonymously by other authors appended various additions to this. It has also often appeared credited to Carney in a variant form:

Little deeds of kindness,
Little words of love,
Help to make earth happy
Like the heaven above.

== Cultural reference ==
"Little Things" was parodied by Gelett Burgess in his poem "Tidiness" in Goops and How to Be Them, A Manual of Manners for Polite Infants (1908):

Little scraps of paper,
Little crumbs of food,
Make a room untidy
Everywhere they're strewed.

The first verse appears in the song "Reason Enough" on Andreas Vollenweider's album Eolian Minstrel, sung by Eliza Gilkyson.

== Notes ==
How many stanzas are there in the poem titled little things.
