= George Ruby =

African-American politician in Reconstruction Texas (1841–1882)

George Thompson Ruby
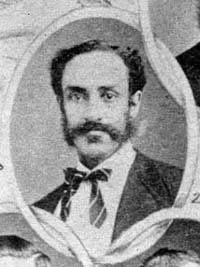

Member of the Texas Senate from the 12th district
- In office February 8, 1870 – January 13, 1874
- Preceded by: Benjamin T. Selman
- Succeeded by: Thomas Miller Joseph

Personal details
- Born: July 1, 1841 New York City, U.S.
- Died: October 31, 1882 (aged 41) New Orleans, Louisiana, U.S.
- Party: Republican
- Parent(s): Reuben Ruby; Rachel Humphey
- Occupation: Journalist, teacher

George Thompson Ruby (July 1, 1841 – October 31, 1882) was an African-American Republican politician in Reconstruction-era Texas. Born in New York to African-American businessman Reuben Ruby and Rachel Humphey and raised in Portland, Maine, he worked in Boston and Haiti before starting teaching in New Orleans before the end of the American Civil War.

Moving to Galveston, Texas, in 1866, where he worked as an agent for the Freedmen's Bureau, Ruby also organized for the Republican Party. He served as one of ten African-Americans elected to the 1868-1869 state constitutional convention, in the Texas Senate, and as a delegate to two Republican Party national conventions. At the first he was the only African American delegate from Texas. He also was active with labor unions, founding and serving as president of the Texas Colored Labor Convention and Texas House of Councils. He earned a reputation as an educator of Louisiana African-Americans, returning to New Orleans in 1874 after the Euro-American Democratic takeover of the Texas government. He worked as a journalist in that city.

== Career ==
Ruby grew up as a child with his family just outside Portland, Maine, where he had his schooling, and where his father Reuben Ruby was a prominent member of the African-American community. He was the first African-American graduate of Portland High School. Moving to Boston as a young man in 1860, he was hired as a correspondent on the Pine and Palm, run by James Redpath, and sent as a correspondent to Haiti. Redpath's journal supported a movement encouraging African-American colonization in Haiti (which the government there encouraged.) American migrants suffered from the poor economy and the plan was considered a failure in 1862. Ruby returned that year to the United States.

In January 1864, Ruby moved to Louisiana and began teaching school. First he taught in a Baptist church in New Orleans and then, as the Union occupation force expanded its educational efforts into the hinterland, in St. Bernard's Parish. The army dropped its responsibility for schooling at the war's end. The American Missionary Association needed teachers, and Ruby worked for them in New Orleans. When the Freedmen's Bureau schools started up, he was hired to teach there. In 1866, he went to Jackson in East Feliciana Parish to open a Bureau school there. A white mob attacked him and tried to drive him out.

According to Barry Crouch, Ruby learned leadership roles in Louisiana from 1863 to 1866. The Army assigned Ruby to the Freedmen's Bureau. His roles encompassed that of a teacher, a school administrator, and a mobile inspector for the Bureau. His responsibilities included assessing local conditions, assisting in the establishment of black schools, and evaluating the performance of Bureau field officers. Ruby's endeavors were met with a positive response from the black population, who eagerly embraced education, but they also faced vehement opposition, including physical violence, from numerous planters and other white individuals. Ruby's career exemplifies the role played by the Black carpetbagger during the Civil War and Reconstruction era in Louisiana.

== Texas politics ==
In September 1866, with Louisiana schools shutting down for lack of funding, Ruby left for Texas. The Freedmen's Bureau agent assigned him as agent and teacher in Galveston. (This was not unusual; many black teachers with experience in Louisiana migrated to Texas, where their past association ensured that they had colleagues in their new surroundings). Working to set up and run schools for blacks, Ruby also helped organize local chapters of the Union League on which mobilization for the newly created Republican party would depend. In 1868, he was elected the League's first state president, a powerful political position. Later that year, he was the first African-American from Texas to attend the Republican National Convention. In time he became editor of the Galveston Standard. Like many Republican papers, it had a brief life.

Provisional Governor Elisha M. Pease appointed Ruby as a notary public in Galveston. When elections took place for delegates to a state constitutional convention in 1868, Ruby was chosen for the district comprising Brazoria, Galveston, and Matagorda counties. He was one of ten African Americans elected as delegates. He allied with the more radical end of the party. Deeply disturbed by the conservative compromises that made it into the final document, Ruby worked for some months to have it defeated or rejected by the national government. In the end, he accepted it as the best that could be done, if a Republican government was to survive at all. He believed that equal rights for blacks in Texas depended on a Republican government.

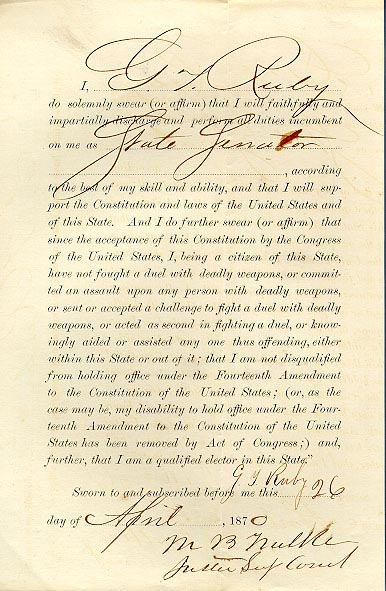
Signed oath of office by George Ruby in April of 1870

Although discussed as a possible running-mate for Republican gubernatorial nominee Edmund J. Davis, Ruby was far younger at age 28 than would have been the norm. In addition, Republicans were reluctant to nominate a black candidate, because of the risk of driving away white votes. Blacks were a minority statewide. In 1870, he was first elected to the Texas Senate in a very close vote, where he served two terms, in 1870-71 and again in 1873, for the 12th and 13th Texas Legislatures. He pressed hard for bills protecting the freed people's civil rights, including a measure opening public conveyances to all, regardless of race—a bill that white members made sure never came to a vote. At the same time, with an eye to his largely white constituency, Ruby introduced bills supporting construction of railroads radiating from Galveston, including several transcontinental projects such as the Southern Pacific and the International & Great Northern. Railroad aid was not a win-win deal; money or lands appropriated to help out their projects came at the expense of other needs of the state, such as a well-financed public school system. He served as a delegate to two Republican Party national conventions, the first time as the only African American from Texas.

He was also appointed as a customs officer in Galveston in 1869. With close connections to labor organizations in Galveston and as president of the Texas Colored Labor Convention in 1869, Ruby had influence far beyond Galveston. He also helped black workers gain jobs at the Galveston docks after 1870. One historian called Ruby, "the most important black politician in Texas during Reconstruction in terms of power and ability."

He had an ability to mobilize Republican voters along the Gulf Coast and black voters everywhere in Texas. "In the post-Civil War era no black man in Texas exercised more political power than did George Thompson Ruby," Moneyhon wrote. "An astute politician, Ruby built a base of power in the black community of Galveston, then used that support to make himself a major force in the state at large. He was a forceful advocate of civil and political rights for his race, but he knew when to compromise to gain his larger goals, and he moved carefully among hostile white politicians in his efforts to expand opportunities for black people."

== Return to Louisiana and journalism ==
With the return of the Democrats to power in 1874, Ruby left Texas and returned to Louisiana. He found work on the New Orleans Louisianian, a black Republican newspaper edited by Louisiana's former lieutenant-governor, Pinckney B. S. Pinchback. He gained a job in the New Orleans custom-house, but Ruby's main occupation was newspaper work. He worked with Pinchback's paper until 1878. That year he became editor of the New Orleans Observer, a paper which he established, operating it through the 1880 election. After its demise, he began another, the New Orleans Republic.

In the late 1870s, Ruby became a strong supporter of the Exoduster movement. It supported the voluntary migration of freedmen from the Deep South to Kansas, in order to escape segregation, violence and white supremacy.

Still an influential spokesperson for black interests in Louisiana, Ruby died on October 31, 1882, of malaria at his home on Euterpe Street, New Orleans.
