= Kings County Colored Mens Association =

19th-century Brooklyn advocacy group

The Kings County Colored Mens Association of Brooklyn, New York, in the United States, was a Reconstruction-era political advocacy group. The group, seemingly led by Rev. A. N. Freeman, held regular meetings and debates, elected convention delegates, and endorsed candidates, namely Ulysses S. Grant for president. In 1866 the group met to discuss the progress of civil rights legislation and the conversation turned to the allegiances of President Andrew Johnson.

I am opposed to President Johnson. He is in my way, and in the way of my people, and I don't believe he means to do us justice ... Do you recollect how David prayed for his enemies? I believe he prayed they might be sent to hell...I didn't pray to have Andy Johnson sent to hell. I prayed that he might be taken out of my way; and I thought if the Lord sent him to hell, it would be on his own responsibility. [Laughter]

— Rev. Mr. Bundick speaking

The group may have been a "9th Ward appendage" of the Republican Party, and seems to have been disbanded by the 1880s.
