= Abraham Niles =

Abraham Walker Niles (December 10, 1807- June 22, 1852) was an American abolitionist, deacon, and mariner. He was born and raised in Castine, Maine and later settled in Portland. Niles was a co-founder of the Abyssinian Meeting House, one of the oldest Black churches in the United States. Active in politics, Niles was a Whig Party activist and participated in the 1841 Maine Colored Convention. Niles and his wife Harriet built a home adjacent to the Abyssinian which survived the 1866 great fire of Portland, Maine and remains intact to the present day. He died in June 1852 while working on a ship traveling between Panama and San Francisco during the California gold rush.
