= Question books =

Books used in American Sunday schools

Question books are books used by American teachers of Sunday school. Since Sunday school teachers did not usually possess formal pedagogical training, the books assisted the teachers by providing questions to pose to their students regarding Bible verses.
