= Portland Freedom Trail =

Historical walking trail in Portland, Maine

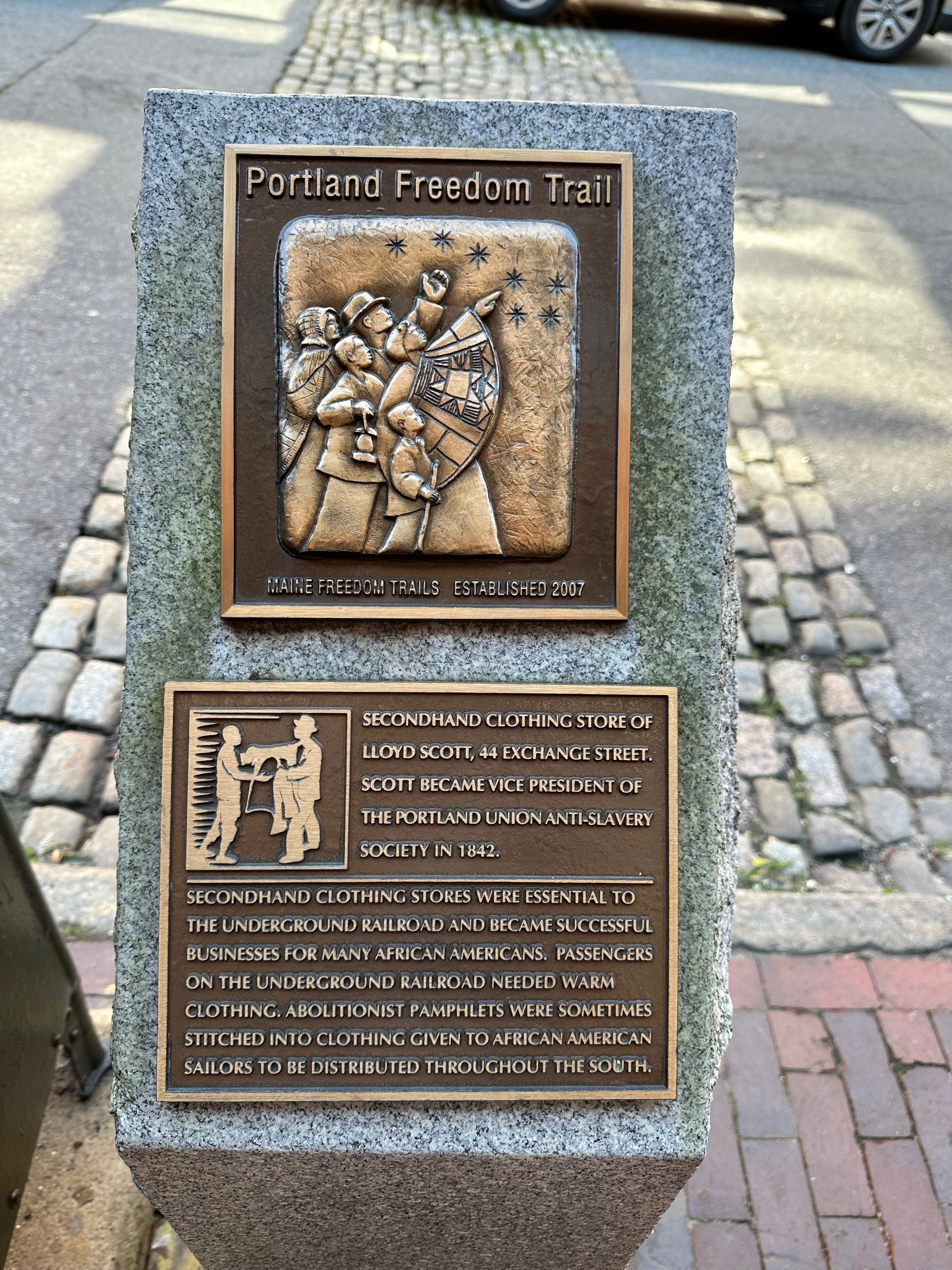
- A marker of the Portland Freedom Trail on Exchange Street
- Length: 2 mi (3.2 km)
- Location: Portland, Maine, U.S.
- Established: 2007 (19 years ago)
- Use: Walking, history
- Difficulty: Easy
- Sights: 13
- Surface: Brick

The Portland Freedom Trail is a self-guided walking tour of Portland, Maine. Established in 2007, its 2-mile (3.2 km) course passes through the city's oldest and most historic areas, including those related to its African American population, and features thirteen points of interest. Most of the stops are in the Old Port and Arts District. The Abyssinian Meeting House, the third-oldest African American meetinghouse in the country, is a stop on the tour, while several others are tied to the city's former Underground Railroad.

== Markers ==
The granite markers with bronze plates denoting points on the tour were designed and created by Daniel Minter, a contemporary artist in the city who was instrumental in creating the trail. Some of the stops on the tour mark extant locations, while others mark former locations.

== Sites ==
The thirteen stops on the tour are:

1. Franklin Street wharf, on Commercial Street, where enslaved people once arrived as stowaways on their journey to freedom
2. Barber Shop of Jacob C. Dickson, 243 Fore Street
3. Hack Stand of Charles H. L. Pierre, 29 Middle Street
4. Abyssinian Meeting House, 73 Newbury Street. The Abyssinian Meeting House was the first black congregation in Maine and a significant part of Maine's Underground Railroad network.
5. Home of Charles Frederick, Harriet Stephenson Eastman and Alexander Stephenson, corner of Mountfort and Newbury Streets
6. Eastern Cemetery
7. Home of Elias and Elizabeth Widgery Thomas, corner of India Street and Congress Street
8. Home of General Samuel C. Fessenden, 31 India Street
9. Friends (Quaker) Meeting House, Lincoln Park, corner of Federal and Pearl Streets
10. Hack stand of Reuben Ruby, corner of Federal and Temple Streets. Ruby was Portland's foremost African American Anti-Slavery activist and underground railroad conductor
11. First Parish Church, 425 Congress Street. The church was where an audience of 2,000 heard abolitionist William Lloyd Garrison speak in 1832. In 1842, a pro-slavery riot occurred at the church after abolitionist Stephen Symonds Foster spoke about New England's role in the institution of slavery.
12. Secondhand Clothing Store of Lloyd Scott, 44 Exchange Street
13. Mariner's Church, corner of Fore Street and Moulton Street, where there was an anti-slavery bookstore and a printshop run by Daniel Colesworthy. The print shop published Light and Truth From Ancient and Sacred History, by Robert Benjamin Lewis. The book was the first Afro-centric history printed in the U.S.

== Gallery ==
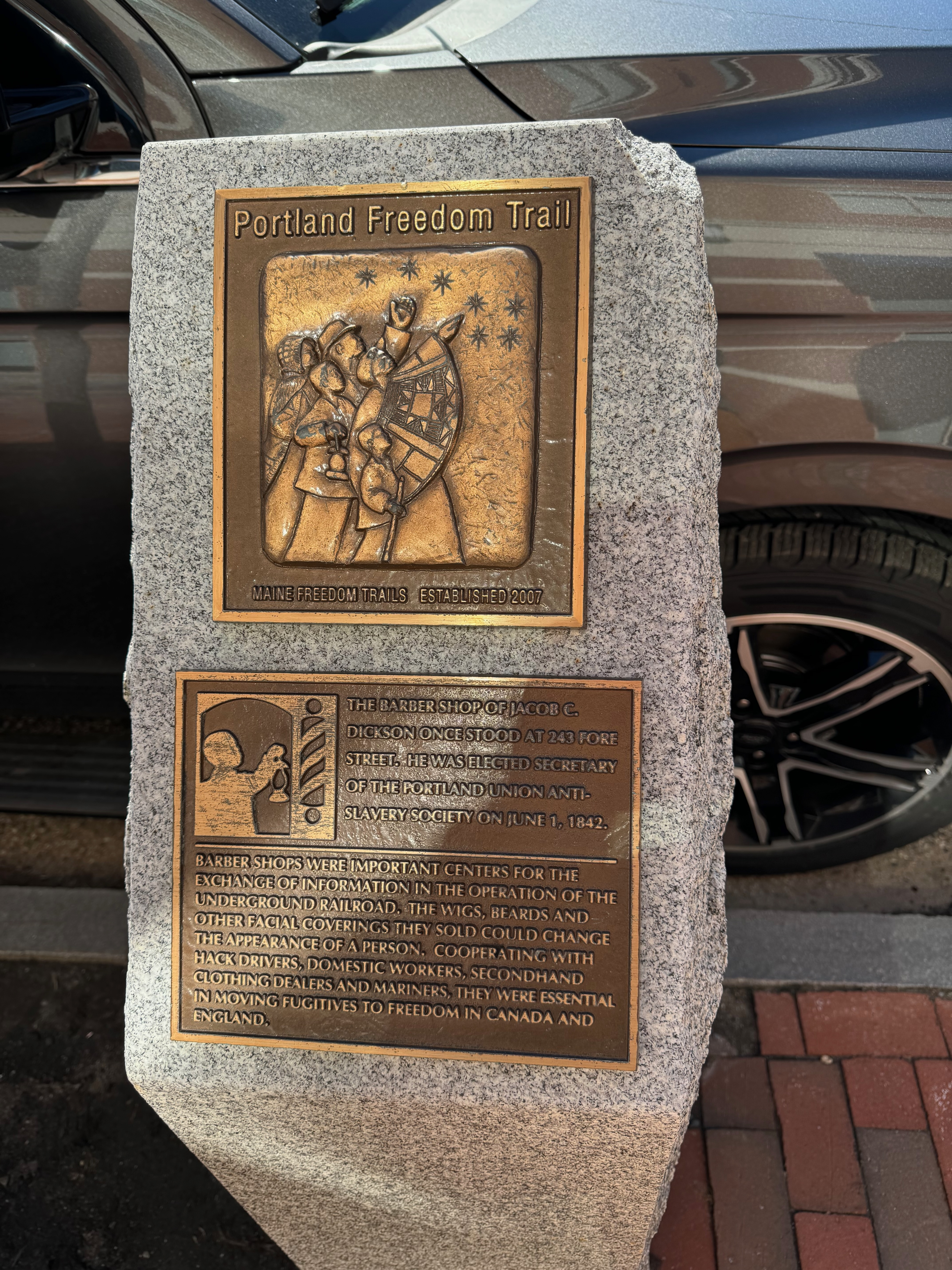
Marker number 2, on Fore Street

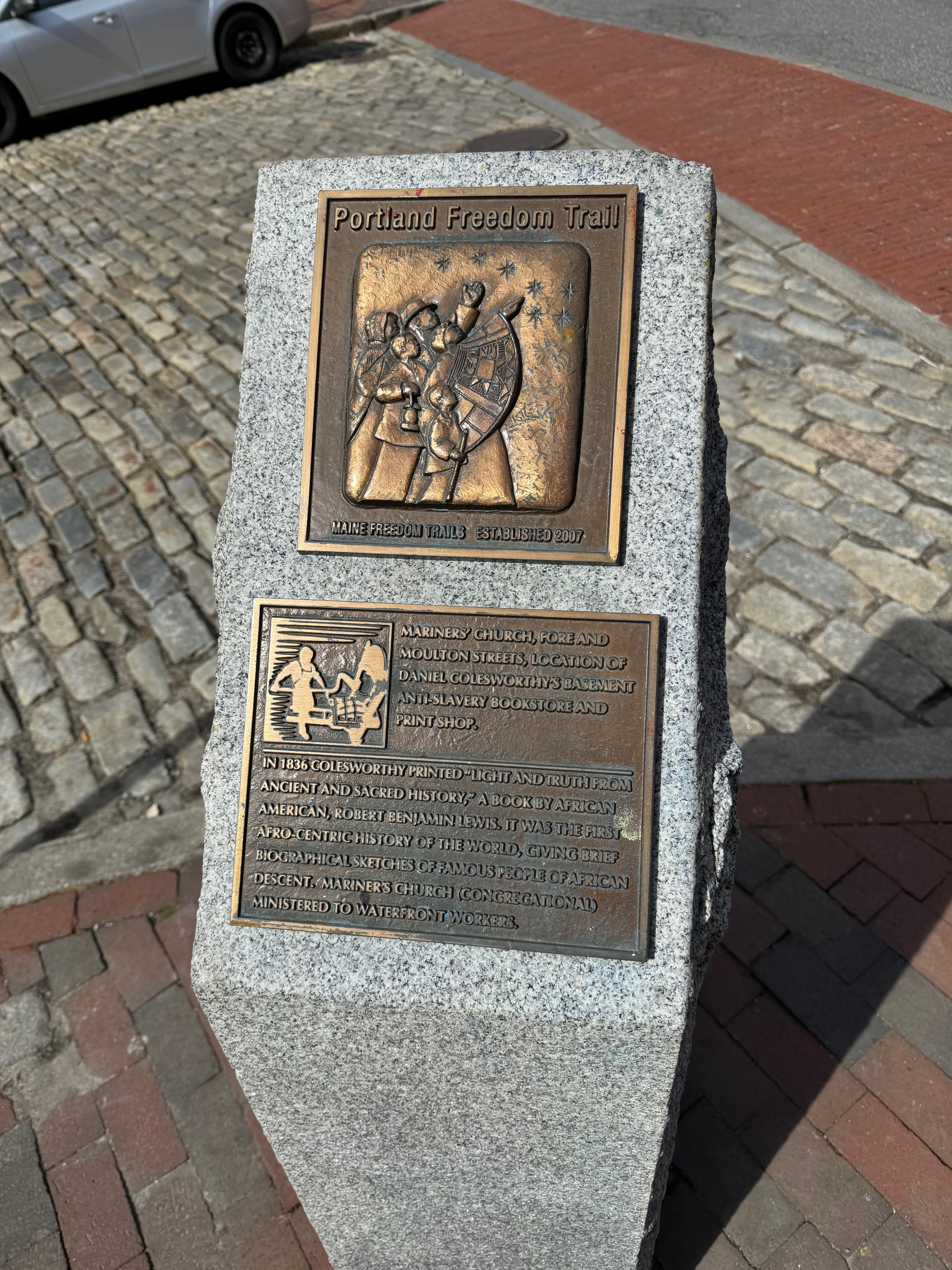
Marker number 13, at the corner of Fore Street and Moulton Street

== See also ==
- Malaga Island
- Cummings' Guest House
- Rock Rest
