= Abyssinian Meeting House =

Historic church in Maine, United States

- U.S. National Register of Historic Places
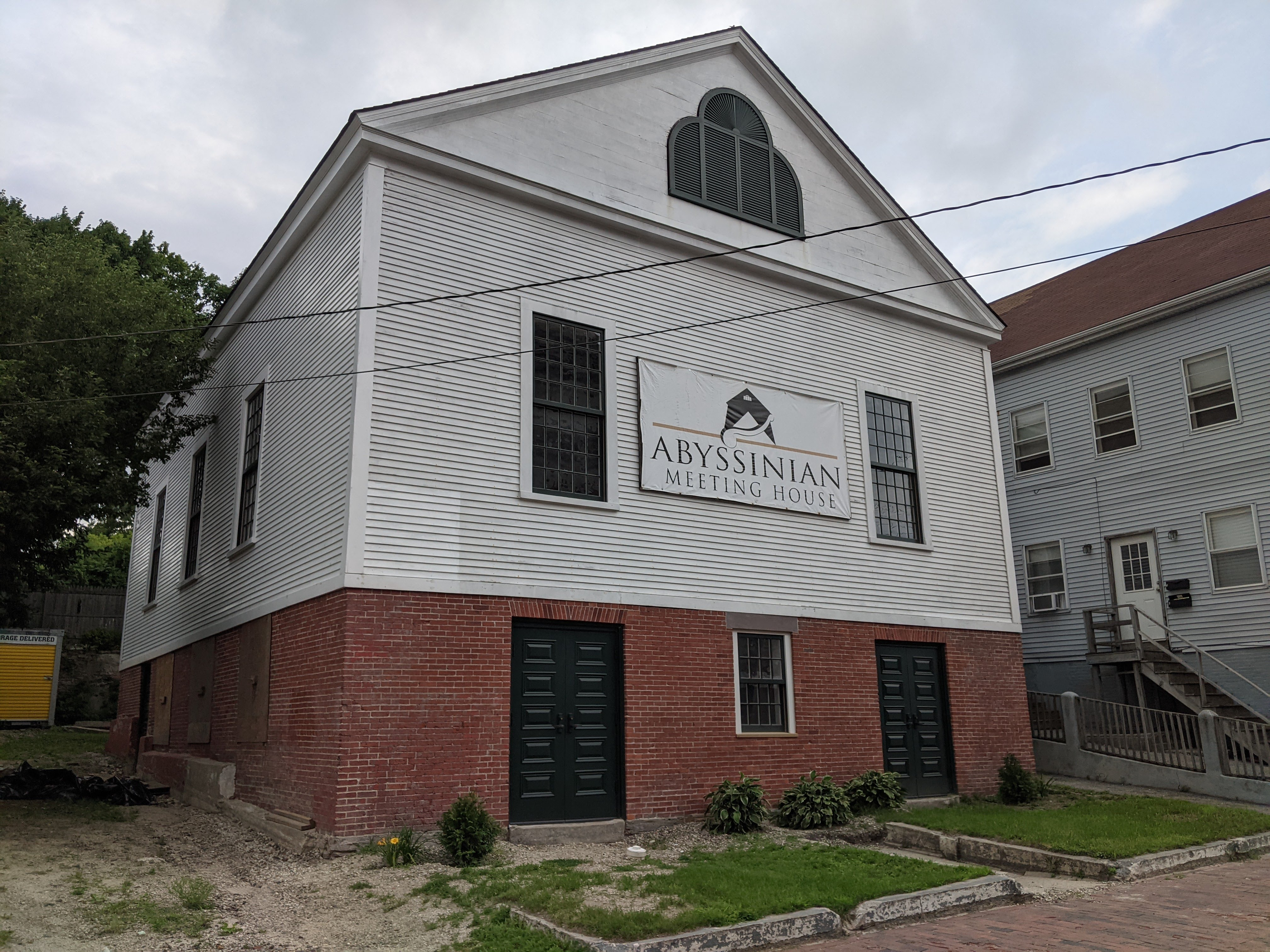

- Location within Maine Location within the United States
- Location: 73–75 Newbury St., Portland, Maine, U.S.
- Coordinates: 43.6623°N 70.2485°W
- Area: less than one acre
- Built: 1831
- Architectural style: Federal
- NRHP reference No.: 05001612
- Added to NRHP: February 3, 2006

The Abyssinian Meeting House is a historic church building at 73–75 Newbury Street, in the Munjoy Hill neighborhood of Portland, Maine. Built between 1828 and 1831 by free African-Americans, it is Maine's oldest African-American church building, and the third-oldest in the nation. Throughout the years, the Abyssinian was a place for worship and revivals, abolition and temperance meetings, speakers and concerts, the Female Benevolent Society, the Portland Union Anti-Slavery Society and negro conventions, and the black school in Portland from the mid-1840s through the mid-1850s. The building is the only Underground Railroad site in Maine recognized by the National Park Service. It was listed on the National Register of Historic Places in 2006.

== A House of Worship (1828–1917) ==
The Abyssinian was the cultural center for African-Americans in southern Maine. It was formed to meet the demand from African-Americans in Portland to have a place to worship. Christopher Christian Manuel, his brother-in-law Reuben Ruby, Caleb Jonson, Clement Thomson, Job L. Wentworth, and John Siggs published a letter on September 19, 1826, in the Eastern Argus newspaper which condemned the Second Congregational Church in Portland for treating non-white members as second-class citizens. At the time, church pews were segregated and African-Americans were designated balcony seating or discouraged from attending services at all. Manuel, Ruby and three others petitioned the state of Maine for incorporation of the Abyssinian Religious Society in 1828. The building became the Abyssinian Congregational Church.

Reuben Ruby (1798–1878) played a central role in the beginning of the Abyssinian. He transferred the original land to the Society in March 1831 and performed work on the interior of the building. Throughout the Northeast, he enjoyed a reputation as an unwavering spokesman against slavery and was a major participant in forming the Maine Anti-Slavery Society in 1834. He was self-employed as a hackman and, through his business, transported escaped slaves. Ruby also hosted William Lloyd Garrison in his home. In 1836, Ruby brought a suit against the Society for non-payment on the mortgage he held and improvements he had made to the building. Ruby was a defendant in an 1837 case brought against him by Samuel W. Chase, minister the Abyssinian.

The Abyssinian housed an active congregation for 86 years, from 1831 to 1917. In 1842, some black parishioners from the Fourth Congregational Church in Portland merged with the Abyssinian Religious Society to form the Abyssinian Congregational Church and Society. It also was known as the Sumner Street Church and then the Newbury Street Church, as the name of the street changed.

The Reverend Amos Noé Freeman (1810–93) was the first full-time minister at the Abyssinian. His tenure was from 1841 to 1851 and was focused on employment, temperance, and abolishing slavery. As a known Underground Railroad agent, he used the building to host and organize anti-slavery speakers, Negro conventions and testimonies from runaway slaves. By 1845, he took on the role of principal of a segregated school for black children where it saw great improvements, including the addition of music education.

In 1846, the location of the school for black children moved from the North School to the vestry of the Abyssinian. In 1851, there were 75 scholars numbered in the school with an average attendance of 55 students. The school was discharged in 1856 and African-American students have attended integrated schools ever since.

It is one of the few buildings to survive the 1866 Great Fire of Portland, Maine. Local folklore includes stories about parishioners fighting to protect the building.

== Mandated dissolution ==
The church's congregation declined in size over the course of the 19th century, due in part to the growing number of churches in the city, and a gradual dispersal of the African-American population. In 1898, when the SS Portland was shipwrecked, it took with it seventeen male congregants, including two trustees. This was a severe blow to the congregation, which was thereafter reduced to minimal activity.

An act of the Maine Legislature, passed February 24, 1917, dissolved and sold the Abyssinian on July 28, 1917. Most of the parishioners became members of the African Methodist Episcopal Zion Church, now known as the Green Memorial A.M.E. Zion Church located on Sheridan Street in Portland. The proceeds of the sale of the building and furnishings went to the Congregational Conferences and Missionary Society of Maine. As stated in the act, any income gained after repayment of loans was to be entered into an Abyssinian Fund. Accurate expense records were to be kept in the event of "erection, repair or alteration of any church building for colored people in the City of Portland, or for the support of any church, or religious work among the people of that race in said city." Direction of the fund is at the discretion of the Missionary Society.

After the sale, the Abyssinian was used as a stable and an antique store, then developed into tenement apartments in 1924. It was seized for unpaid taxes by the City of Portland in 1991.

== Landmark status and restoration ==
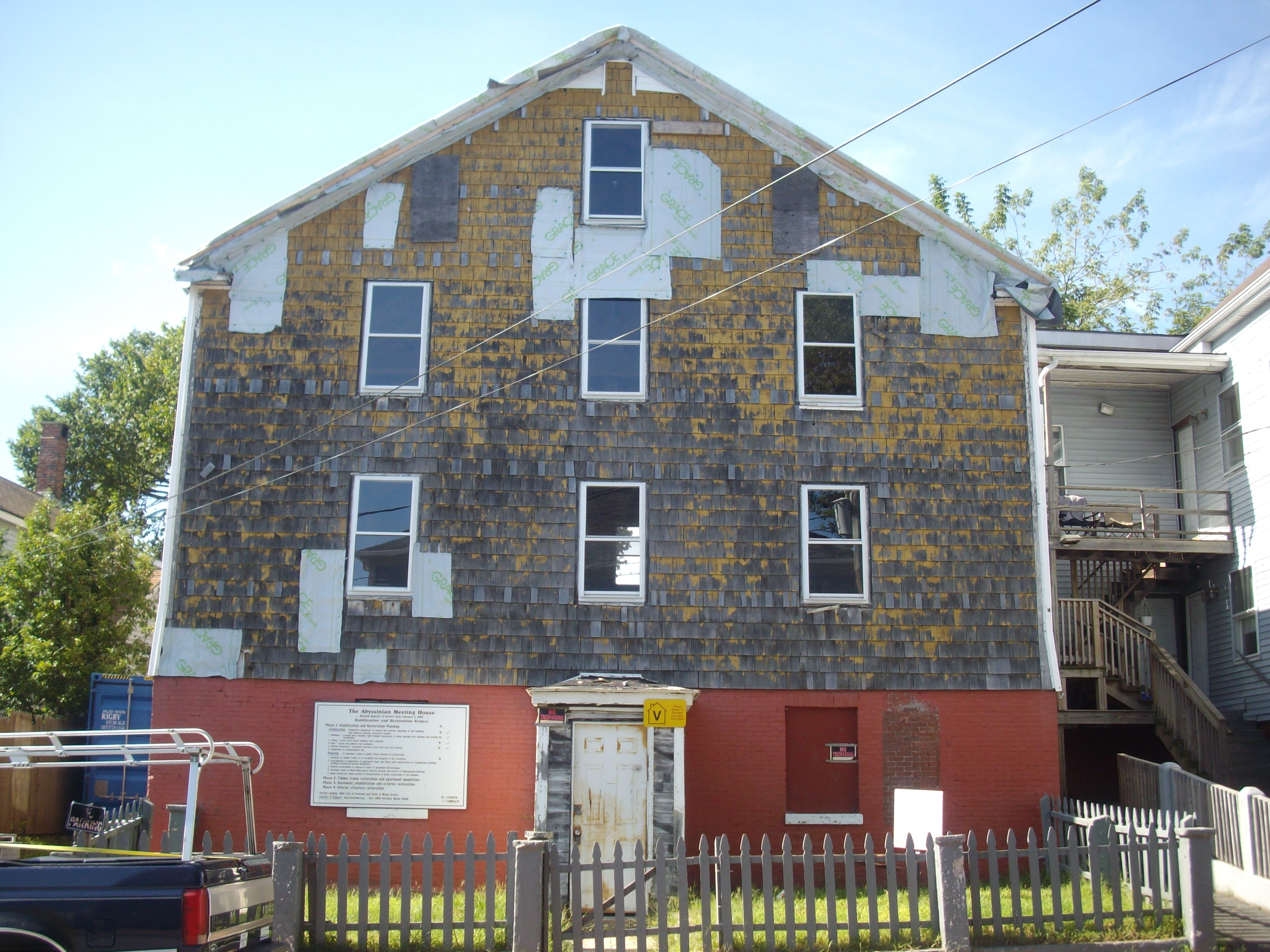
The facade of Abyssinian Meeting House from Newbury Street circa 2009.

After sitting vacant for six years, the Abyssinian was bought for historic preservation by the Committee to Restore the Abyssinian in 1998. It is the third-oldest African-American meeting house in the United States after Boston and Nantucket, Massachusetts. The Committee purchased the building from the City of Portland for $250, the original price for which the Society purchased the land from Reuben Ruby in 1828.

It was listed on the National Register of Historic Places in 2006, the year the restoration began, and on the National Underground Railroad Network to Freedom in 2007.

In April 2008, an archeological dig was conducted to obtain further information on the Meeting House. Unearthed were 19th century toys, slate pencils, an inkwell, marbles, dishes, and bits of glass. While removing construction added during the 1920s, original wooden beams were uncovered. Included in the find are joists which are believed to have been part of the choir loft. During restoration efforts, a clay pipe broke in the basement and a steady stream began to run. In 2011, a project was undertaken to contain the free flowing water and a wooden water pipe was discovered on the site. The pipe was reburied to preserve it. Later excavation revealed that the owners of the swampy property filtered the encroaching through an uncovered system of sand boxes and piped it to the Grand Trunk Railroad.

In September 2012, Greater Portland Landmarks named the Abyssianian as one of seven historic sites in peril due to lack of restoration funding. A $375,000 (~$438,946 in 2025) grant was established in 2021 for the building's restoration.

== See also ==
- National Register of Historic Places listings in Portland, Maine
- Portland Freedom Trail
- Green Memorial A.M.E. Zion Church
- Abraham Niles, co-founder and neighbor
