= Mariner's Church (Portland, Maine) =

Historic church in Maine, United States

- U.S. National Register of Historic Places
- U.S. Historic district – Contributing property
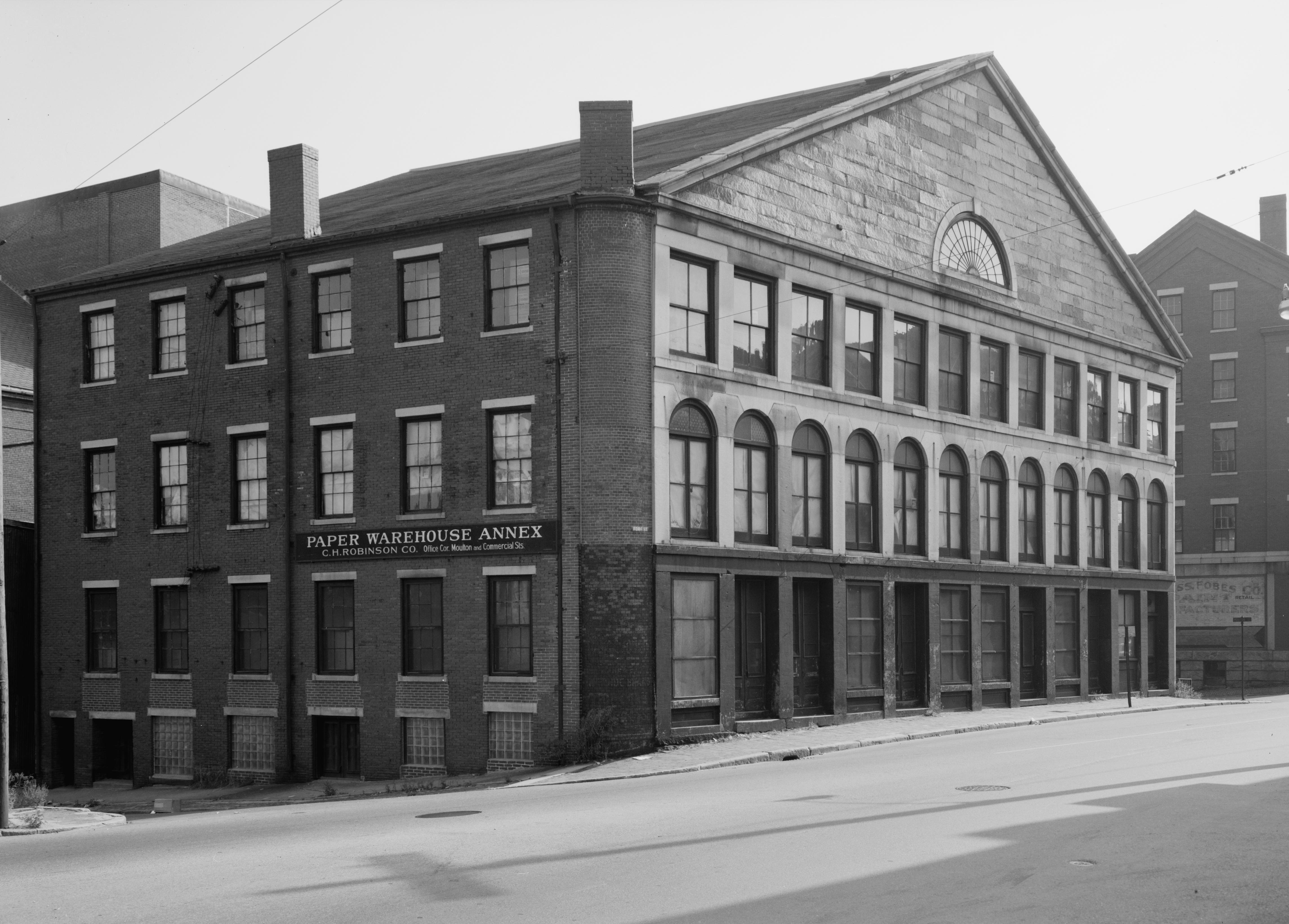
- Front of the church, HABS photo from 1965

- Location within Maine Location within the United States
- Location: 366-376 Fore St., Portland, Maine
- Coordinates: 43°39′23″N 70°15′11″W
- Area: less than one acre
- Built: 1828
- Architectural style: Greek Revival
- Part of: Portland Waterfront (ID74000353)
- NRHP reference No.: 73000117

Significant dates
- Added to NRHP: April 23, 1973
- Designated CP: May 2, 1974

Mariner's Church (also known as the Old Port Tavern and Mariner's Church Banquet Center) is a historic church and commercial building at 366–376 Fore Street in Portland, Maine. Built in 1828, the Greek Revival building historically served as both a church and marketplace. It was for many years the city's largest commercial building, and survived the city's great 1866 fire. It was listed on the National Register of Historic Places in 1973.

== Description and history ==
The former Mariner's Church occupies much of a city block in Portland's Old Port area. It occupies a trapezoidal lot bounded on the north by Fore Street, the east by Market Street, and the west by Moulton Street, with its main facade facing toward Fore Street. It is a three-story masonry structure, built of granite and brick, with a broad gabled roof. The main facade has six storefronts on the ground floor, each with a recessed entrance flanked on one side by a large fixed-pane display window. The second floor has a bank of twelve round-arch windows, with rectangular windows on the third level. The gable above is fully pedimented, with a fanlight window near the center of its base. The building's corners are rounded, the left one in brick and the right one in stone. The main facade is predominantly stone, with the street-facing side walls mainly brick.

The building was constructed in 1828 and was used for "moral and religious" instruction of local mariners, with the building's upkeep supported by the commercial businesses on its ground floor. The building was damaged in the city's 1866 fire. In 1969 the building was purchased by C.H. Robinson who saved it from demolition. In 1973 the building opened as a restaurant known as the Old Port Tavern, and the building was added to the National Register of Historic Places that same year. Today, the building is used for events as the Mariner's Church Banquet Center.

Old Port Tavern, on the Moulton Street side of the building, closed in 2022, after fifty years of operation. Old Port Billiards, on the building's third story, remained open. The property is now affiliated with the Portland Regency Hotel & Spa, a member of Historic Hotels of America.

== See also ==
- National Register of Historic Places listings in Portland, Maine
- Portland Freedom Trail
