= DiMillo's On the Water =

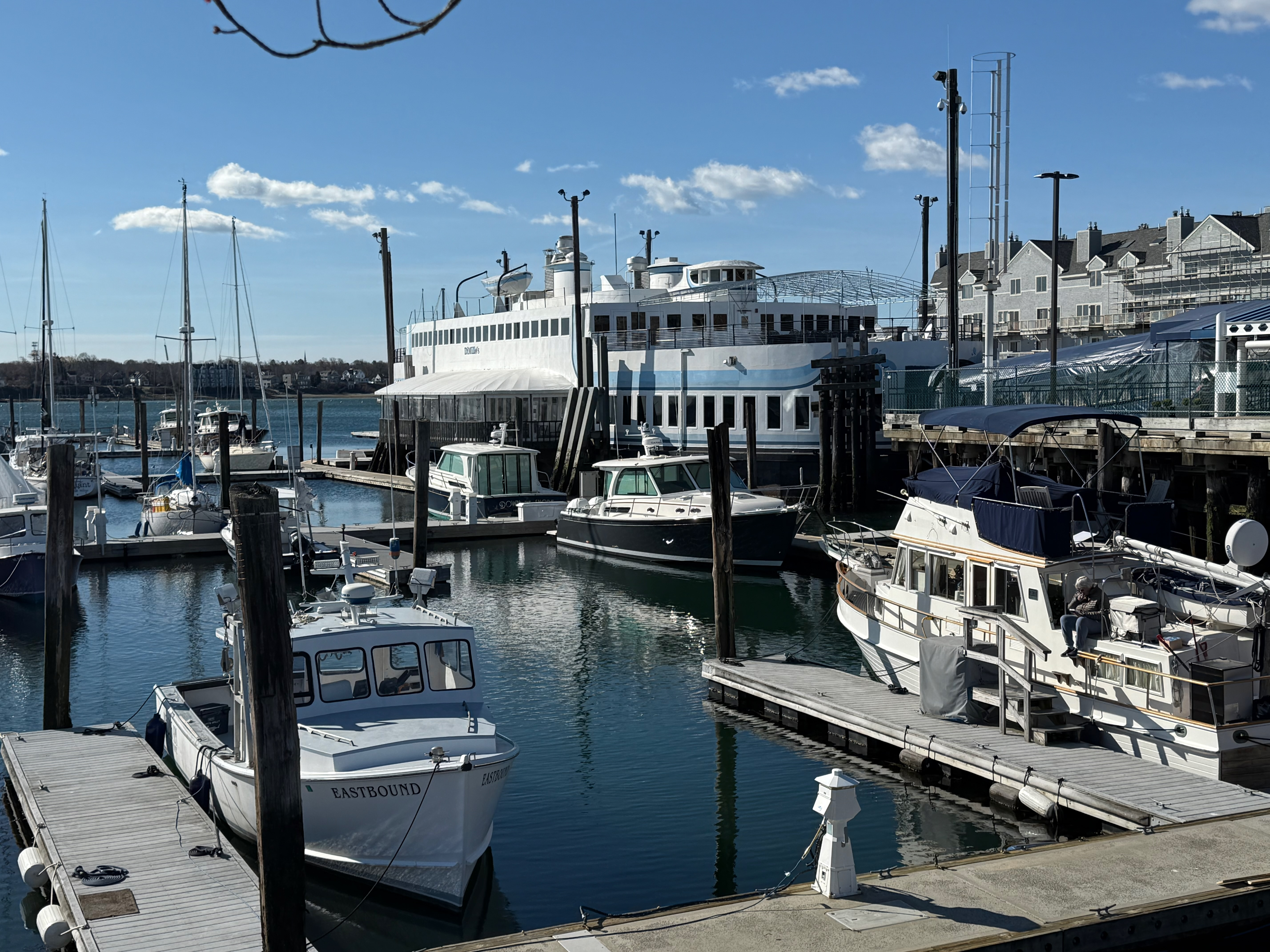
- Viewed from the end of Long Wharf in 2025
- Interactive map of DiMillo's On the Water

Restaurant information
- Established: 1982 (44 years ago)
- Owner: DiMillo family (1999–present)
- Previous owner: Tony DiMillo (1982–1999)
- Head chef: Melissa Bouchard
- Food type: Seafood
- Location: Long Wharf, Portland, Maine, 04101, United States
- Coordinates: 43.6541°N 70.2505°W
- Seating capacity: 550
- Reservations: Yes
- Website: www.dimillos.com

DiMillo's On the Water is a floating restaurant in Portland, Maine, United States. It is located on the former New York car ferry, which ran between Norfolk and Hampton, Virginia, then between Newport and Jamestown, Rhode Island. It is now permanently berthed at Portland's Long Wharf. The vessel is 206 feet (63 m) long, 65 feet (20 m) wide, and weighs 700 tons. The DiMillo family also owns the marina that surrounds the vessel.

== History ==
The restaurant was established in 1982 by Tony DiMillo (1933–1999), who reused the name of his previous business, a lobster restaurant located on the opposite side of Commercial Street. DiMillo's Lobster House opened in 1965. DiMillo's slogan, "The clams you eat here today slept last night in Casco Bay", was kept.

Two menus from DiMillo's are included in a collection of menus held at the Portland Public Library. One is from 1982 and one is from 1989. According to the 1982 menu, that year a complete shore dinner cost $18.95, a lobster roll was $4.75, and spaghetti with plain sauce was $3.25.

In 1994, Bath Iron Works constructed a new outer hull, which the existing ship was attached to. As part of a renovation in 2015, the restaurant's tables were made in Millinocket from reclaimed river logs.

In January 2024, pilings were damaged, hingers were broken and the pier buildings flooded during the 2024 Portland flood.

== Management ==
Steve DiMillo is the restaurant manager, a role he shares with three of his eight siblings: brothers Dan and Johnny and twin sister Stephanie Quattrucci. Arlene DiMillo, widow of Tony, was the company's president until her retirement in 2015.

As of 2022, Melissa Bouchard is the head chef at the restaurant, which has a seating capacity of around 550. Bouchard began working in the DiMillo's kitchen in 1998.

Chris DiMillo manages the yacht sales operation.
