= Mexicali Blues (company) =

Mexicali Blues is a chain of stores based in Maine, that sells its own line of self-branded clothing, jewelry, accessories, home decor and gifts. A privately held company, Mexicali Blues was founded by Pete Erskine and Kim Erskine in 1988 in Portland, Maine. The chain's "hippie" aesthetic was largely inspired by the Grateful Dead, whose merchandise was a focal point of the original store's sales. The store was named for the band's 1972 song "Mexicali Blues".

In 2005, CEO Topher Mallory was hired to help expand retail stores and online operations. An affordable pricing scheme coupled with a vertically integrated business plan has been one of the reasons Mexicali Blues has maintained profitability and been able to grow every year from 1996 thru 2010.. Mexicali Blues designs, manufactures and imports its products directly from, Nepal, India, Thailand, Mexico, Guatemala and Bali.

The company tag line is "clothing that fits your mind, jewelry to accent your life".

Currently Mexicali Blues has store locations in Portland, Newcastle, Raymond, Freeport and Bangor. The office, warehouse and website distribution center are in Newcastle, Maine. Its store on Moulton Street in Portland closed in 2020 after 28 years; it moved to 219 Commercial Street.
