= Long Wharf (Portland, Maine) =

Historic wharf in Portland, Maine, U.S.

Coordinates: 43°39′21″N 70°15′07″W

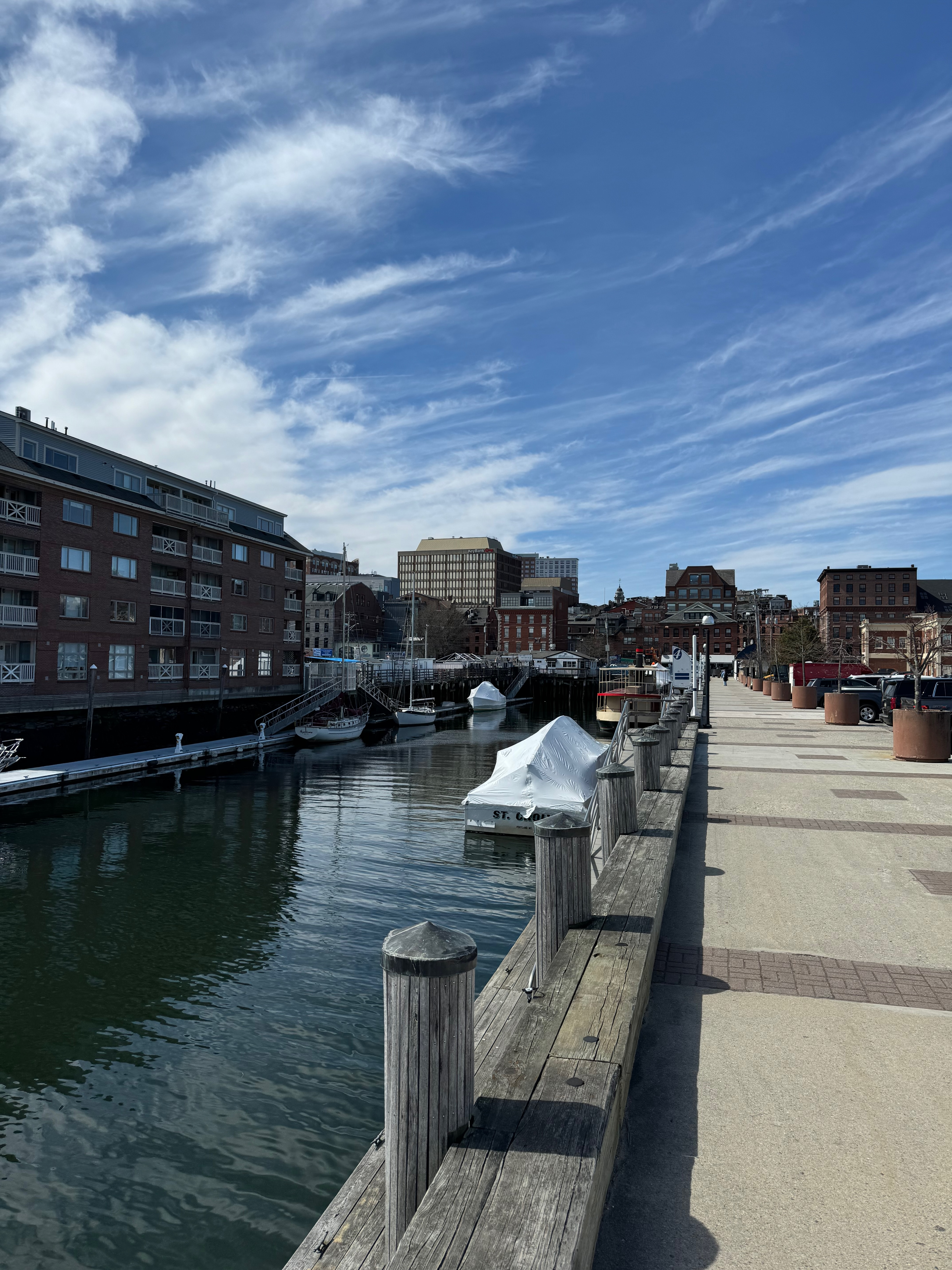
- Long Wharf (right), looking southwest to Chandler's Wharf
- Location: Commercial Street, Portland, Maine, U.S.

Long Wharf is a historic wharf in Portland, Maine, on the edge of the Fore River. It stands across Commercial Street, between Market Street and Moulton Street and, on the waterfront side, between Portland Pier (to the north) and Chandler's Wharf (to the south).

Portland Lobster Company stands at the foot of the wharf, at Commercial Street, while DiMillo's On the Water is a floating restaurant located on a boat moored at the wharf. Sections of the former Berlin Wall stand on the southern side of the wharf, near today's Gorham Savings Bank.

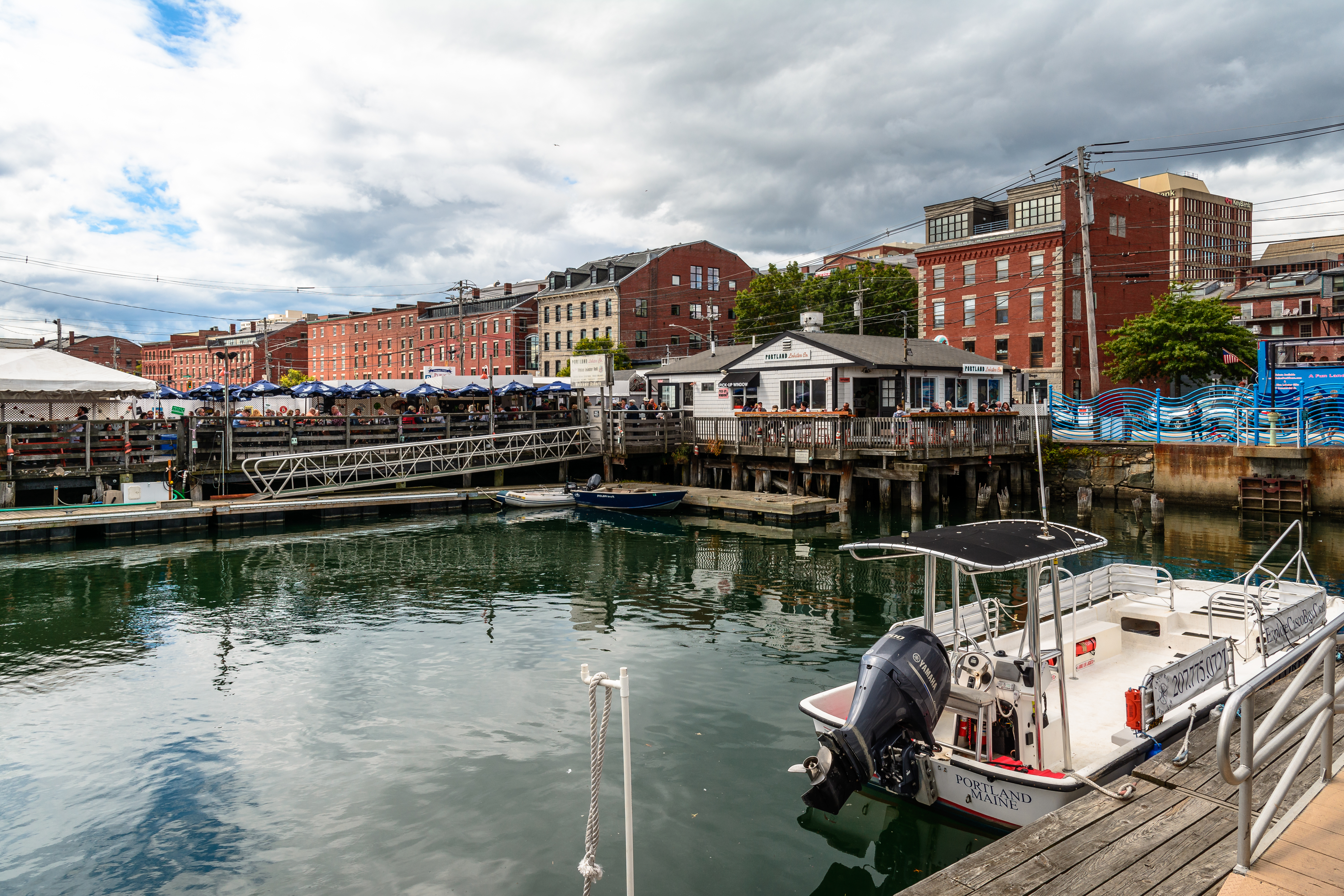
Portland Lobster Company stands at the foot of Long Wharf

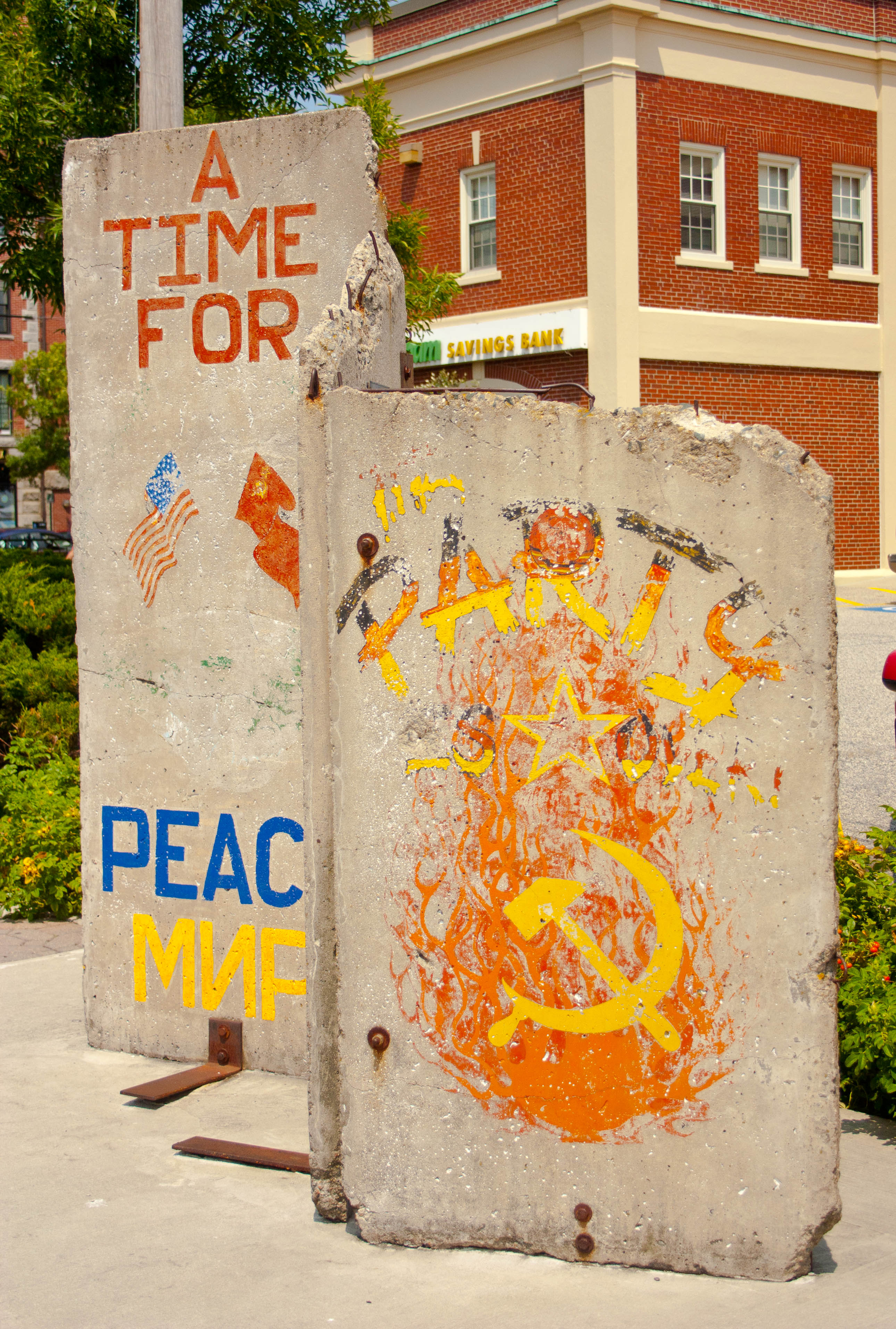
Sections of the former Berlin Wall stand on the wharf's southern side
