= List of bridges in Portland, Maine =

This is a list of bridges in Portland, Maine.

- Casco Bay Bridge (Completed in 1997 to replace the Million Dollar Bridge over the Fore River. It connects Portland and South Portland.)
- Martin's Point Bridge (Original bridge was completed in 1828. New bridge opened in June 2014.)
- Million Dollar Bridge (defunct; completed in 1916. Replaced by the Casco Bay Bridge. It spans the Fore River and connects Portland and Falmouth)
- Tukey's Bridge (Original bridge was in 1796 as a toll bridge. Current bridge was completed in 1960. Connects Munjoy Hill neighborhood with East Deering neighborhood.)
- Veteran's Memorial Bridge (original was built in 1954. A new bridge by the same name was completed in 2012. It spans the Fore River and connects Portland with South Portland.)
