= J. H. Ingraham =

J. H. Ingraham may refer to:

- Joseph Holt Ingraham (writer), American author
- Joseph Holt Ingraham (silversmith), American silversmith
- James Henry Ingraham, African American who served as an officer in the American Civil War
