= Joseph Holt Ingraham =

Joseph Holt Ingraham may refer to:

- Joseph Holt Ingraham (writer), American author
- Joseph Holt Ingraham (silversmith), American silversmith
