= William Washburn (architect) =

American architect

Chairman of the Boston Board of Aldermen
- In office 1855
- Preceded by: Office established
- Succeeded by: Phelham Bonney

Member of the Boston Board of Aldermen
- In office 1854–1855

Member of the Boston Common Council
- In office 1853

Personal details
- Born: October 7, 1808 Lyme, New Hampshire, United States
- Died: October 31, 1890 (aged 82) Boston, Massachusetts, United States
- Party: Democratic (before 1848); Free Soil (1848–1854); Republican (after 1854)
- Profession: Architect

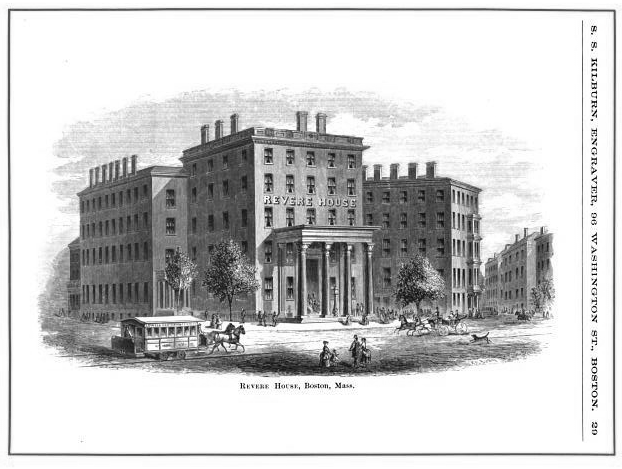
The Revere House in Bowdoin Square, Boston, designed by Washburn in the Greek Revival style and competed in 1847; c. 1865 engraving by Samuel Smith Kilburn

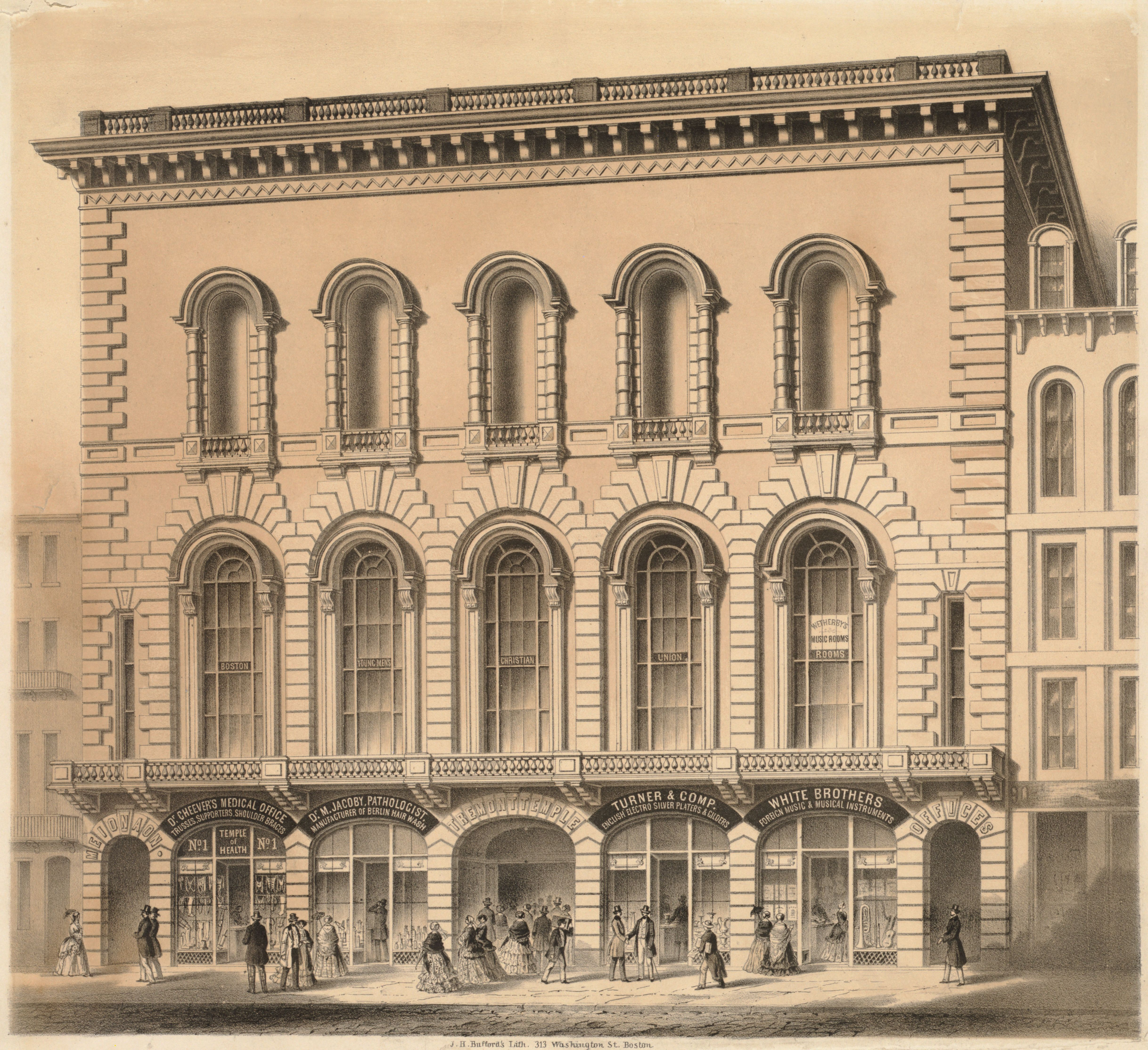
The second Tremont Temple, designed by Washburn in the Italianate style and completed in 1853

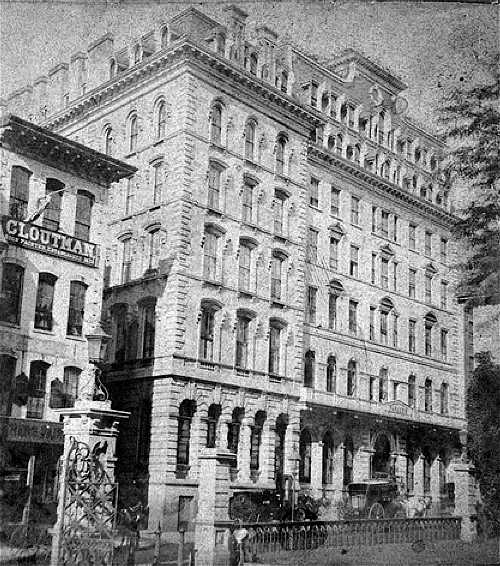
The Parker House in Boston, designed by Washburn in the Italianate and Second Empire styles and completed in parts; the first, the five-story building at right, was completed in 1855 without the Mansard roof

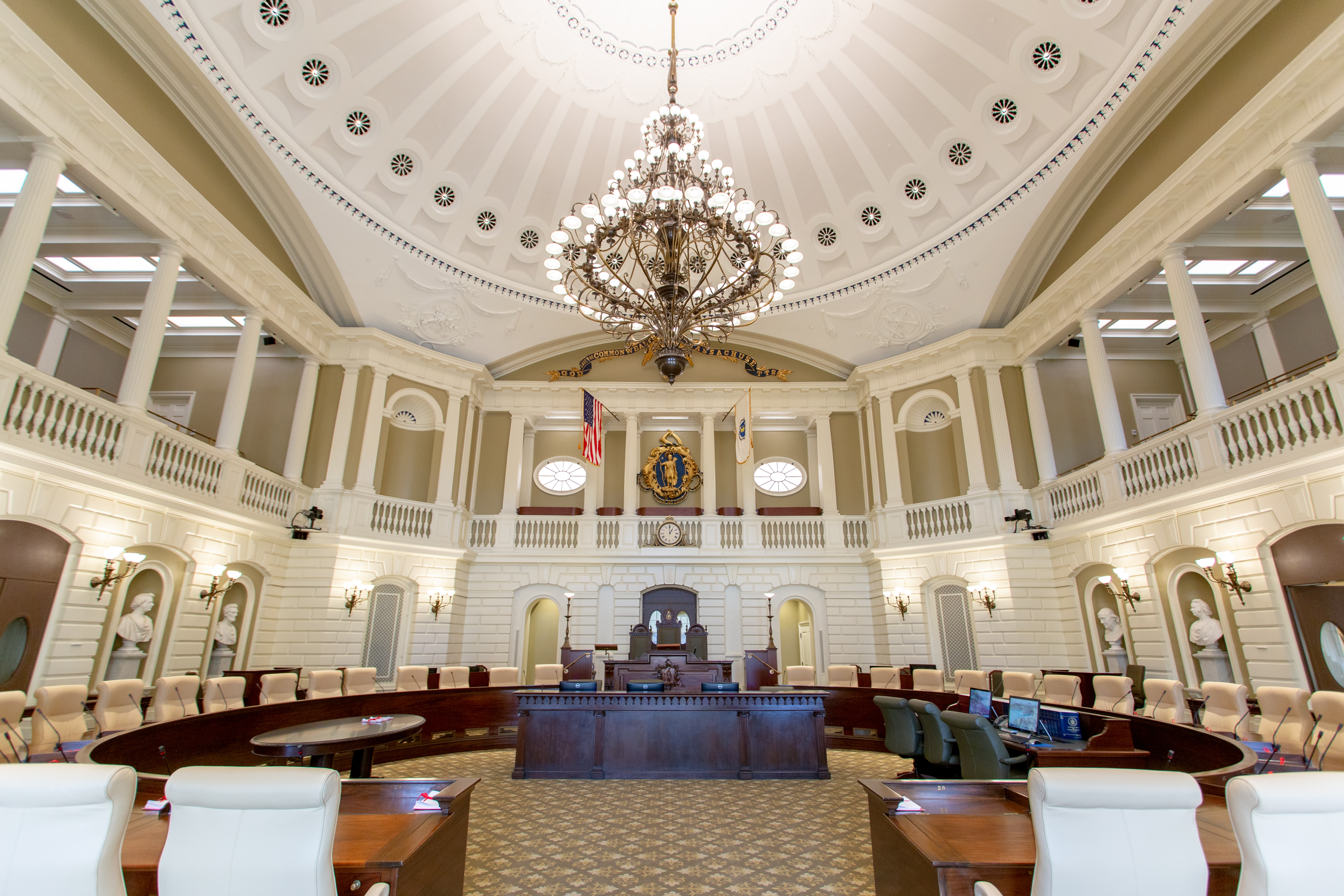
The chamber of the Massachusetts Senate in the Massachusetts State House, as expanded and remodeled by William and Moses Washburn in 1868

William Washburn (October 7, 1808 – October 31, 1890) was an American architect active in Boston during the nineteenth century. A hotel specialist, very little of his work survives. Before the Civil War he was active in the abolitionist movement and served on the Boston Common Council and Board of Aldermen as a Free Soiler from 1853 to 1855; he served as chairman of the Board of Aldermen in 1855.

== Early life and career ==
William Washburn was born October 7, 1808, in Lyme, New Hampshire. He came to Boston very young and was trained as a carpenter. In 1830 he was assistant to Isaiah Rogers in the conversion of the Old State House into the Boston City Hall. He first appears in the Boston directories in 1831 as a housewright at the same address as his brothers, Jeremiah and Theodore. By 1833 the brothers had formed a partnership, J. Washburn & Brothers, housewrights. During the next decade Washburn designed Grace Church (1835, demolished), the National Theatre (1836, burned) and the United States Hotel (1840, demolished). The latter building was closely based on the Tremont House (1829), designed by Washburn's former employer Rogers. The Washburn partnership was dissolved in 1841 and Washburn carried on first in partnership with carpenter Charles W. Brown and then independently.

In 1839 Washburn joined the Massachusetts Charitable Mechanic Association and was elected to its governing board in 1846. He was then appointed to the building committee of the Revere House (1847, demolished), a proposed hotel in Bowdoin Square, and soon after was appointed superintendent, having full oversight of the design and construction of the hotel. The Revere House, together with the earlier United States Hotel, established Washburn as a designer of hotels.

== Architectural career ==
Not long after the completion of the Revere House Washburn was hired to design the Sagadahock House (1849, burned), a hotel in Bath, Maine. The distance meant that for the first time Washburn could not build what he designed. From the Boston Directory of 1849 forward he is listed as "architect" rather than "housewright." Over his nearly forty-year professional career Washburn worked independently and as senior member of several partnerships: Washburn & Alexander (c. 1849–c. 1850) with Charles A. Alexander, Washburn & Brown with Edwin Lee Brown (c. 1854–1856), Washburn & Moore (c. 1856) with Frederic H. Moore and William Washburn & Son (c. 1860–c. 1872) with his son, Moses Washburn.

Washburn's Boston hotels included the American House (1851, demolished), the Parker House (1855 et seq., demolished) and Young's Hotel (1860, demolished). For Paran Stevens he completed the interiors of the Fifth Avenue Hotel (1859, demolished) in New York City, originally designed by Griffith Thomas. His obituaries also credited him with the Hotel Victoria, built by Stevens in 1872 as an apartment hotel from plans by Richard Morris Hunt and converted into a commercial hotel in 1879. Moses Washburn was his representative in Saint John, New Brunswick, where he designed the Victoria Hotel (1871, burned in 1877) and the Academy of Music (1872, burned in 1877).

His churches were the State Street Congregational Church (1852, altered) in Portland, Maine, and the First Baptist Church (1854, demolished) in Boston, both in the Gothic Revival style, and the Italianate second Tremont Temple (1853, demolished). After the American Civil War Washburn designed the City Hall (1868, demolished) in Charlestown, a simplified version of the ornate Old City Hall in Boston, and remodeled the Massachusetts State House (1868). Washburn's changes to the exterior were reversed in a later restoration but his version of the House of Representatives chamber, now the Senate chamber, remains. Here, Washburn pulled back the east and west galleries to be flush with the lower level–which was rusticated–added the north and south galleries and cut holes in the dome to unobtrusively provide for artificial lighting. His last works included the Charles Roberts legislative boarding house (1871) on Beacon Hill, Beethoven Hall (1874, demolished) and the second Adams House hotel (1883, demolished). The Roberts boarding house and the Adams House were both designed in an unusual hybrid of the Second Empire and Egyptian Revival styles.

Very little of Washburn's work is extant. His only hotel-type project to survive is the Roberts boarding house. Of his public and religious projects, only the interior of the State Street Congregational Church and the Massachusetts Senate chamber are extant. His only other extant works are private homes: the Cambridge mansion of Henry A. Fuller (c. 1858) and a row of houses for James French (c. 1863), occupying the southern side of Tremont Street between West Dedham and Aguadilla Streets.

== Political activity ==
Washburn's political activity dates from at least 1840, when he was Democratic nominee for a seat in the Massachusetts House of Representatives. He was also nominee for a seat on the Boston Board of Aldermen that year and in 1841. In 1842 he was nominated by the Democrats as their candidate to succeed Nathan Appleton as representative for Massachusetts's 1st congressional district. The Boston Post, a Democratic newspaper, described Washburn as "a practical man–an intelligent and honest mechanic–and a sound [D]emocrat," and encouraged the workingmen of Boston to avail themselves of the "opportunity of sending one of your own class to represent you in Congress." In this election, the Boston Democrats explicitly aligned themselves with the goals of the recently-suppressed Dorr Rebellion in Rhode Island. Washburn was defeated by Whig candidate Robert C. Winthrop.

He does not seem to have stood for election again until 1848, when he was a nominee of the recently-formed anti-slavery Free Soil party to the Board of Aldermen. He was their nominee for a state senate seat in 1849 and won his first election, to the Boston Common Council, in a special election in 1853. He almost immediately, and unsuccessfully, ran for state senate again, but in the city elections of December of that year he was elected to the Board of Aldermen. He was an opponent of the expansion of slavery into Kansas and Nebraska. Washburn, now a Republican, was reelected in December 1854 and upon the organization of the new city government in January he was elected first chairman of the board. He resigned in November over internal disagreements over how to best mitigate traffic between Dock Square and the new train stations near Haymarket Square.

== Personal life and death ==
Washburn was married in 1836 to Christiana Hall. Washburn died October 31, 1890, in Boston at the age of 82.

Washburn was elected to the Ancient and Honorable Artillery Company of Massachusetts in 1842.

At his death his obituary in the Boston Globe identified him as a prominent member of the abolitionist movement in Boston, "a confrere of Phillips and Garrison, and one of the most active opponents of slavery in those times when even in Boston the slave power was most potent."
