= Julie N oil spill =

Oil tanker accident and spillage in Maine (1996)

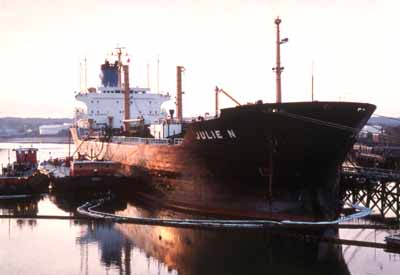
The Julie N oil spill being contained

The Julie N oil spill occurred on September 27, 1996, when the Liberian-flagged oil tanker Julie N struck the Million Dollar Bridge in Portland, Maine while carrying over 200,000 barrels (32,000 m^{3}) of heating oil. An estimated 180,000 U.S. gallons (680,000 liters) of oil was spilled in the incident; about 38,000 U.S. gallons (140,000 liters) was never recovered.

== Background ==
On September 21, 1996, the 560 foot (170 m) Julie N departed Amuay Bay, Venezuela after receiving a load of heating oil, arriving in Casco Bay on the night of September 26. The next morning, the ship set off from its anchorage in Portland Harbor en route to the Rolling Mills Terminal in South Portland, Maine via the Fore River. The vessel was being operated by a maritime pilot to guide it into port. The pilot, who had worked exclusively in Portland for the last three years, had performed the passage hundreds of times.

At the mouth of the river were two structures side-by-side: the Million Dollar Bridge and its replacement, which was under construction. The working horizontal clearance of the Million Dollar Bridge was 95 feet (29 m) wide, while the ship's beam was 85 feet (26 m), affording only five feet (1.5 m) on either side of the tanker ship to maneuver.

== Accident ==
Approaching the mouth of the river from the northeast, the pilot issued three orders for port rudder to align the vessel with the channel's centerline. Satisfied with the approach, the pilot then intended to order hard starboard to enter the channel. Instead, the pilot accidentally ordered the ship hard port. While the order was corrected only seconds later, the vessel could not alter course in time to avoid an allision.

At approximately 11:05AM, the Julie N impacted the south side of the Million Dollar Bridge. The impact ripped a 33 foot (10 m) long opening in the side of the ship, which began dumping oil into the Fore River. Winds and ocean currents drove some of the oil upstream into marshes and estuaries.

In total, about 180,000 U.S. gallons (680,000 liters) of petroleum spilled from the hull of the Julie N.

== Aftermath ==
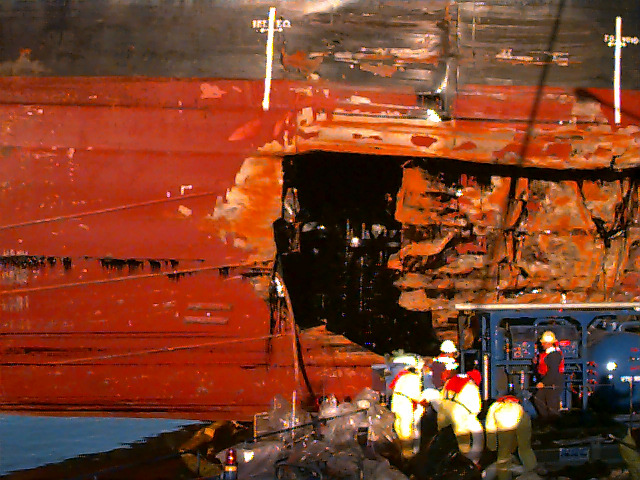
Workers clean residual oil from the bow compartment of Julie N

After the Maine Department of Environmental Protection and US Coast Guard arrived at the scene, the ship was towed to a dock and surrounded by oil booms. The spill was contained relatively early in the incident and an estimated 78% of the oil was recovered.

A team from Bath Iron Works conducted temporary repairs of the vessel after the incident. The ship was inspected multiple times before being allowed to travel under her own power to ASTANO in Spain for further repairs. On her way out of the harbor, Julie N struck a temporary wooden fender which was protecting the bridge that she had struck weeks earlier. Damage to the Million Dollar Bridge was repaired by the contractor who was already building the new bridge, and road traffic resumed on September 29.

=== Cleanup ===
While wildlife immediately within the bay was initially reported to have fared well, later research found PAH-contaminated clams, mussels, and lobster, and more than 1,600 birds were soiled by the oil. The total cost of the cleanup effort was estimated to be $48 million.

An estimated 38,000 U.S. gallons (140,000 liters) of petroleum were unable to be cleaned up and traces of oil can still be found in the region dating back to this disaster. Regardless of this fact, wildlife now flourishes in the areas once engrossed in chemicals. The spill had a significant impact upon the local economy as Maine lobster and fish prices lowered due to national media coverage of the oil spill. Fishing authorities also ordered that there be no private or commercial fishing within a 16-mile zone (26 km), which further damaged the local fishing economy. Furthermore, several thousand lobster traps had to be replaced due to oil contamination.
