= Northern Light Mercy Hospital =

Mercy Hospital
- Northern Light Health
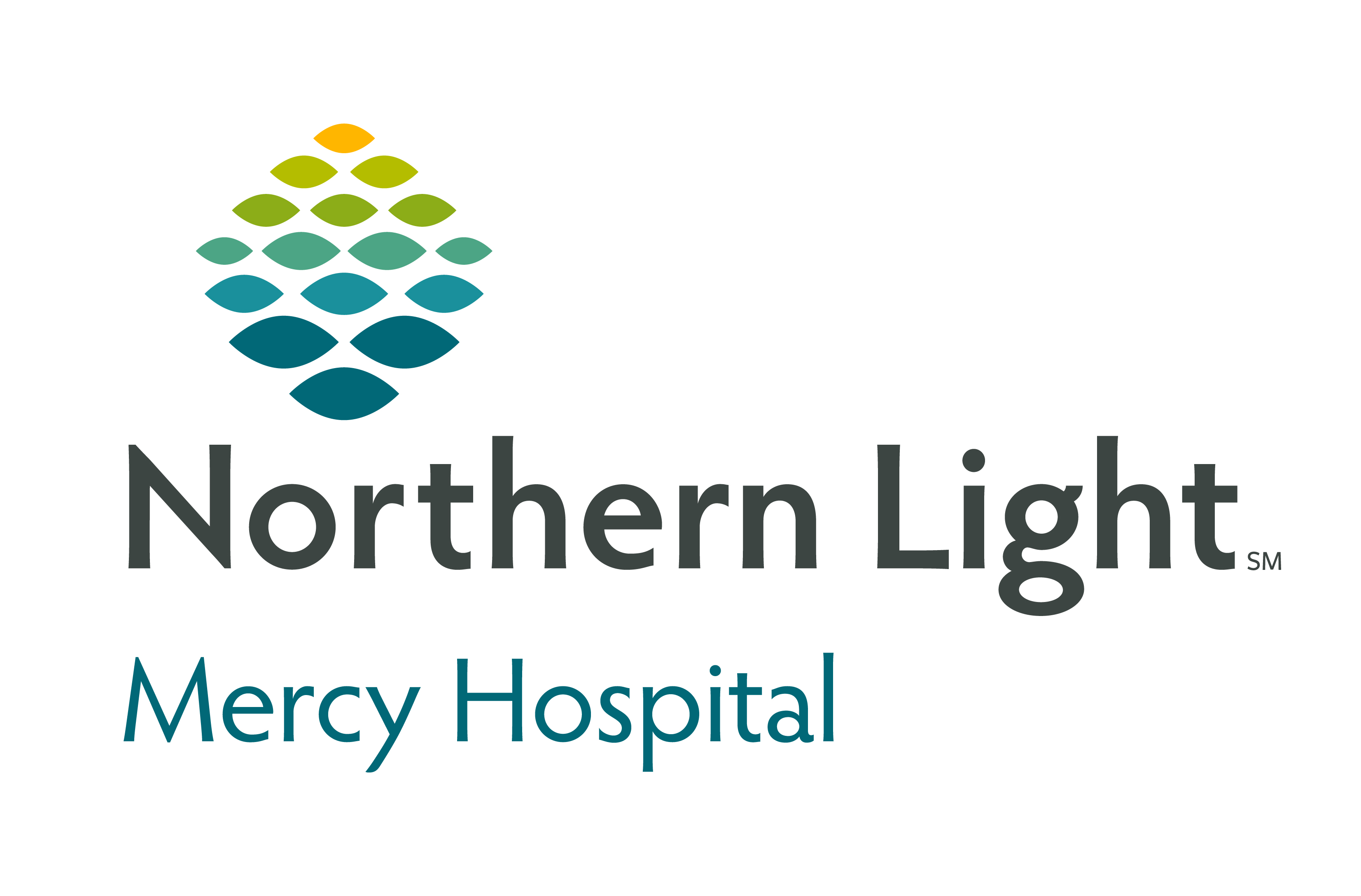

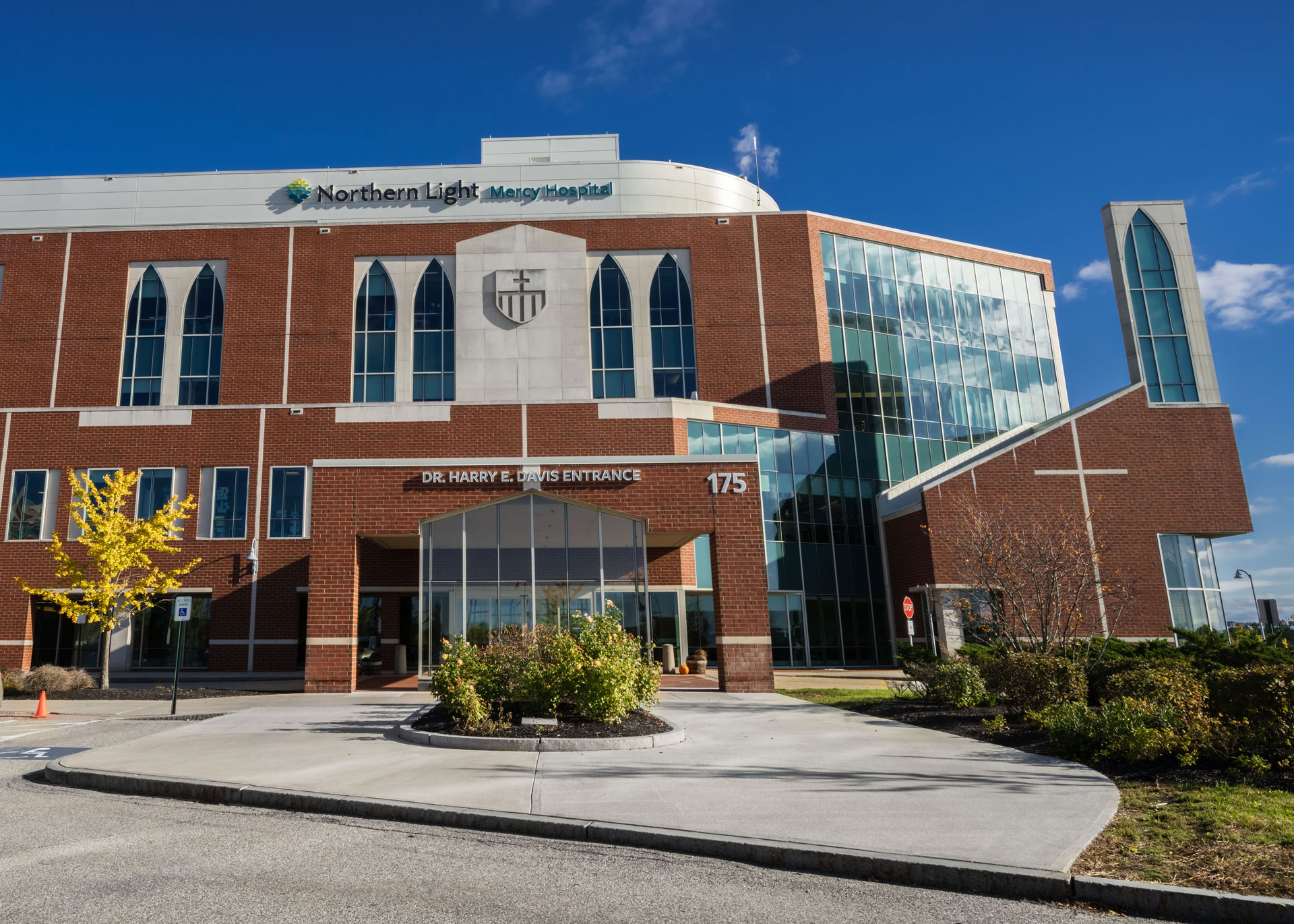
- Main Entrance of Northern Light Mercy Hospital

- Location within Maine

Geography
- Location: 175 Fore River Parkway, Portland, New England, Maine, United States
- Coordinates: 43.6483°N 70.2821°W

Organization
- Type: Non profit
- Religious affiliation: formerly Catholic Church
- Network: Northern Light Health

History
- Former name: Queen's Hospital
- Opened: 1918

Links
- Website: northernlighthealth.org/mercy-hospital
- Lists: Hospitals in Maine

Northern Light Mercy Hospital is a not-for-profit community hospital in Portland, Maine. It was founded in 1918 by the Roman Catholic Diocese of Portland and the Sisters of Mercy to provide excellent healthcare, especially to the poor and disadvantaged. Mercy is located on a 42-acre campus overlooking the Fore River.

== History ==
Northern Light Mercy Hospital opened as "Queen's Hospital" on the corner of State Street and Congress Street in response to the 1918 flu pandemic after city hospitals refused Irish Catholic patients during that pandemic. It had 25 beds.

In 1941, as the United States stood on the brink of entering another world war, the growing city of Portland needed greater hospital capacity. To meet this need, the Sisters of Mercy arranged for the purchase of property at 144 State Street. That same year, the Sisters received additional control from the Diocese of Portland over the management of Queen's. To reflect the transition, Queen's Hospital became Mercy Hospital. In 1943, the new hospital location opened with 150 beds and 36 bassinets. The old Queen's Hospital buildings were kept for housing and classrooms for the 140 students then enrolled in the School of Nursing.

The hospital expanded in 1952 and was significantly renovated in the 1980s.

In 2006, Mercy began construction on its new campus along the Fore River with the plan to eventually consolidate the two campuses into one larger hospital. In September 2008, Mercy opened their new hospital at the Fore River campus. Until the campuses can be consolidated, Mercy would maintain two hospitals in Portland, Maine.

In 2013, Mercy Hospital was acquired by Eastern Maine Healthcare Systems (EMHS) of Brewer, Maine. In 2018, EMHS rebranded as Northern Light Health and Mercy Hospital began doing business as Northern Light Mercy Hospital.

In January 2022, Northern Light Mercy Hospital permanently closed their State Street hospital location once they opened the new emergency room at their Fore River campus. This marked the final step in their campus consolidation efforts.
