= State Street (Portland, Maine) =

Downtown street in Portland, Maine

Coordinates: 43.65317°N 70.26700°W

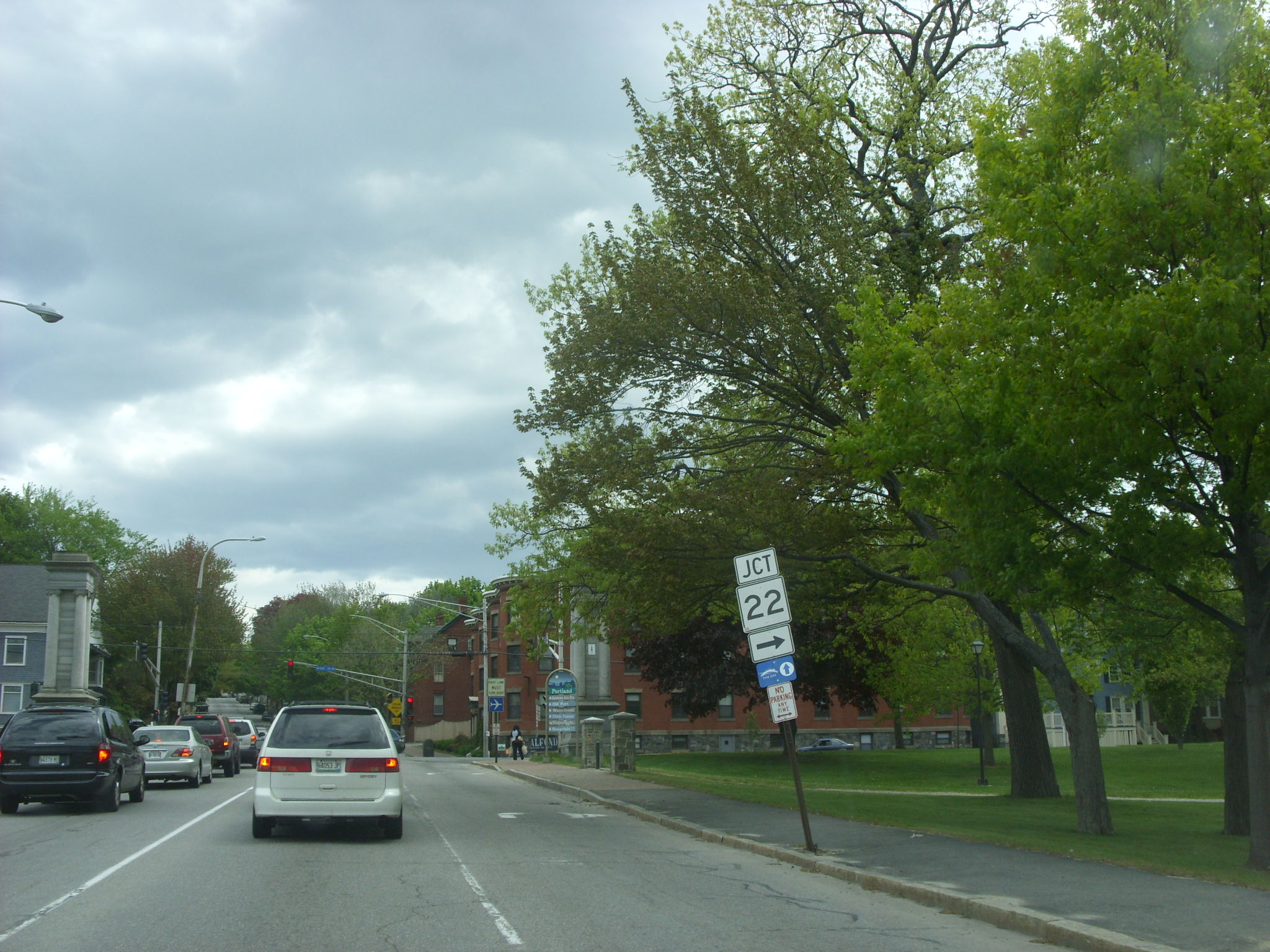
- State Street at Park Avenue, looking toward the southern edge of Deering Oaks Park
- Interactive map of State Street
- Part of: SR 77
- Length: 0.95 mi (1.53 km)
- Location: Portland, Maine, U.S.
- Northwest end: Forest Avenue, Marginal Way, & Kennebec Street
- Southeast end: SR 77 (Casco Bay Bridge) & York Street

State Street is a downtown street in Portland, Maine, United States. Part of Maine State Route 77, it runs one-way for around 0.95 miles (1.53 km), from an intersection with Forest Avenue in the northwest to York Street in the southeast. It is one of the three main routes crossing the Portland peninsula in this direction, the other two being High Street and Franklin Street. Part of the street passes through the Deering Street Historic District.

State Street and High Street were converted from two-way traffic in 1972.

== Route ==
The northwestern end of the street, between Forest Avenue and Park Avenue, passes through Deering Oaks Park, which is on the National Register of Historic Places. It then begins its climb up the hill which runs along the spine of the Portland peninsula from the northeast to the southwest. The hill crests at Congress Street, which in this section is in Longfellow Square. After turning southeast, the street begins a descent down to York Street at the northern end of the Casco Bay Bridge.

At Park Avenue, Maine State Route 77 shares a terminus with SR 22 and SR 25.

== Notable addresses ==
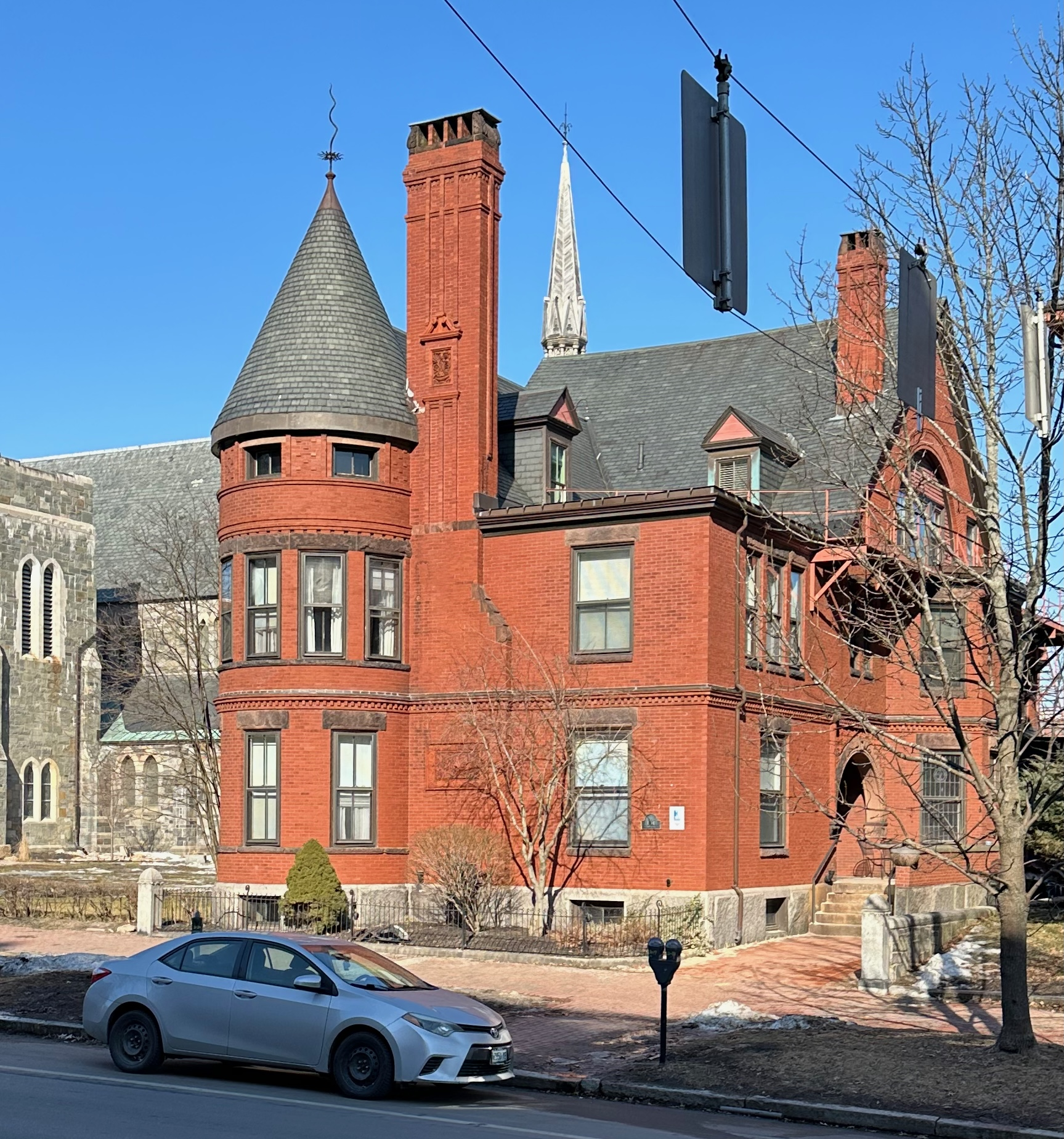
129–131 State Street stands opposite the original Mercy Hospital building

- John Neal Houses (1836), 173–175 State Street, designed by John Neal
- Castle-in-the-Park (1894), Deering Oaks Park
- Lester A. Mercier Block (1908), 291–293 State Street
- Lester A. Mercier Block (1908), 287–289 State Street
- Windsor Apartments (1911), 286–288 State Street
- Llewellyn M. Leighton House (1889), 279 State Street
- William H. Sanborn Block (1886), 278–280 State Street
- George E. Dow House (1887), 276 State Street
- Thomas Brackett Reed House (1876), corner of Deering Street and State Street
- 165 State Street (1825)
- The Portland Club (1805), 156 State Street (listed on the National Register of Historic Places)
- State Street Congregational Church (1851), 159 State Street
- Mercy Hospital (former), 144 State Street
- William E. Gould House, 129–131 State Street
- St. Dominic's Church (former; 1833), entrance on Gray Street
- Joseph Holt Ingraham House (1801), 51 State Street (listed on the National Register of Historic Places)

== Public transportation ==
Greater Portland Metro's route 8 (Peninsula Loop) serves State Street.
