= Million Dollar Bridge (Maine) =

Bridge across the Fore River, Maine, US

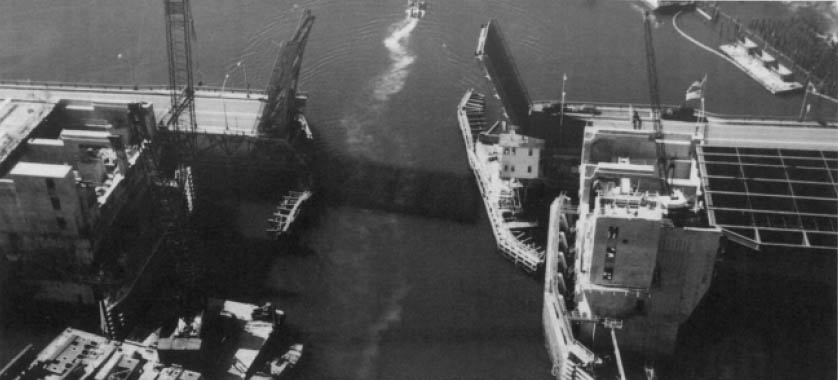
- The Million Dollar Bridge behind the then-under-construction Casco Bay Bridge.
- Coordinates: 43.644647°N 70.25656°W
- Carries: SR 77 and pedestrians
- Crosses: Fore River
- Locale: Portland, Maine, South Portland, Maine

Characteristics
- Design: Girder Bascule
- Clearance below: 24 feet (7.3 m)

History
- Opened: 1916
- Closed: 1998
- Replaced by: Casco Bay Bridge

Statistics
- Daily traffic: 30,000 vehicles per day

Location
- Interactive map of Million Dollar Bridge

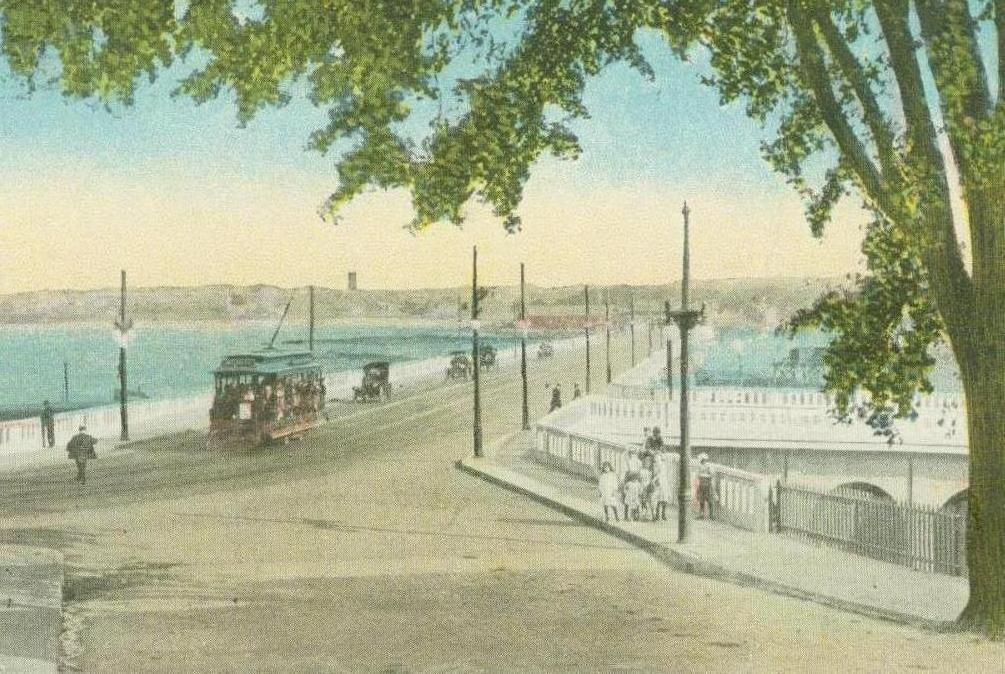
A Portland Railroad Company streetcar crossing the Million Dollar Bridge shortly after its 1916 opening

The Million Dollar Bridge was a bascule bridge built in 1916 which carried traffic on Route 77 over the Fore River in Maine between Portland and South Portland.

Permits to construct the Million Dollar Bridge were issued by the Secretary of War in 1893. The bridge was designed in 1914 and opened to traffic in 1916. The bascule span provided a horizontal clearance of 100 ft (30 m). Originally owned by Cumberland County, the bridge was transferred to the Maine Department of Transportation in 1959.

In 1993, construction began on Casco Bay Bridge, a replacement for the Million Dollar Bridge. The Casco Bay Bridge is a higher bascule bridge, with an alignment just east of the Million Dollar Bridge. During construction of the new bridge, the Million Dollar Bridge was hit by the Liberian Tankship Julie N on September 27, 1996, and emergency repairs were made. The Casco Bay Bridge opened in 1997.
