= Chestnut Street Methodist Church =

Chestnut Street Methodist Church may refer to

in the United States (by state )

- Chestnut Street Methodist Church (Louisville, Kentucky), listed in the National Register of Historic Places in Downtown Louisville, Kentucky
- Chestnut Street Methodist Church (Portland, Maine), listed in the National Register of Historic Places in Portland, Maine
