= List of bridges in Portland =

List of bridges in Portland may refer to:

- List of bridges in Portland, Oregon
- List of bridges in Portland, Maine
