= St. Dominic's Church (Portland, Maine) =

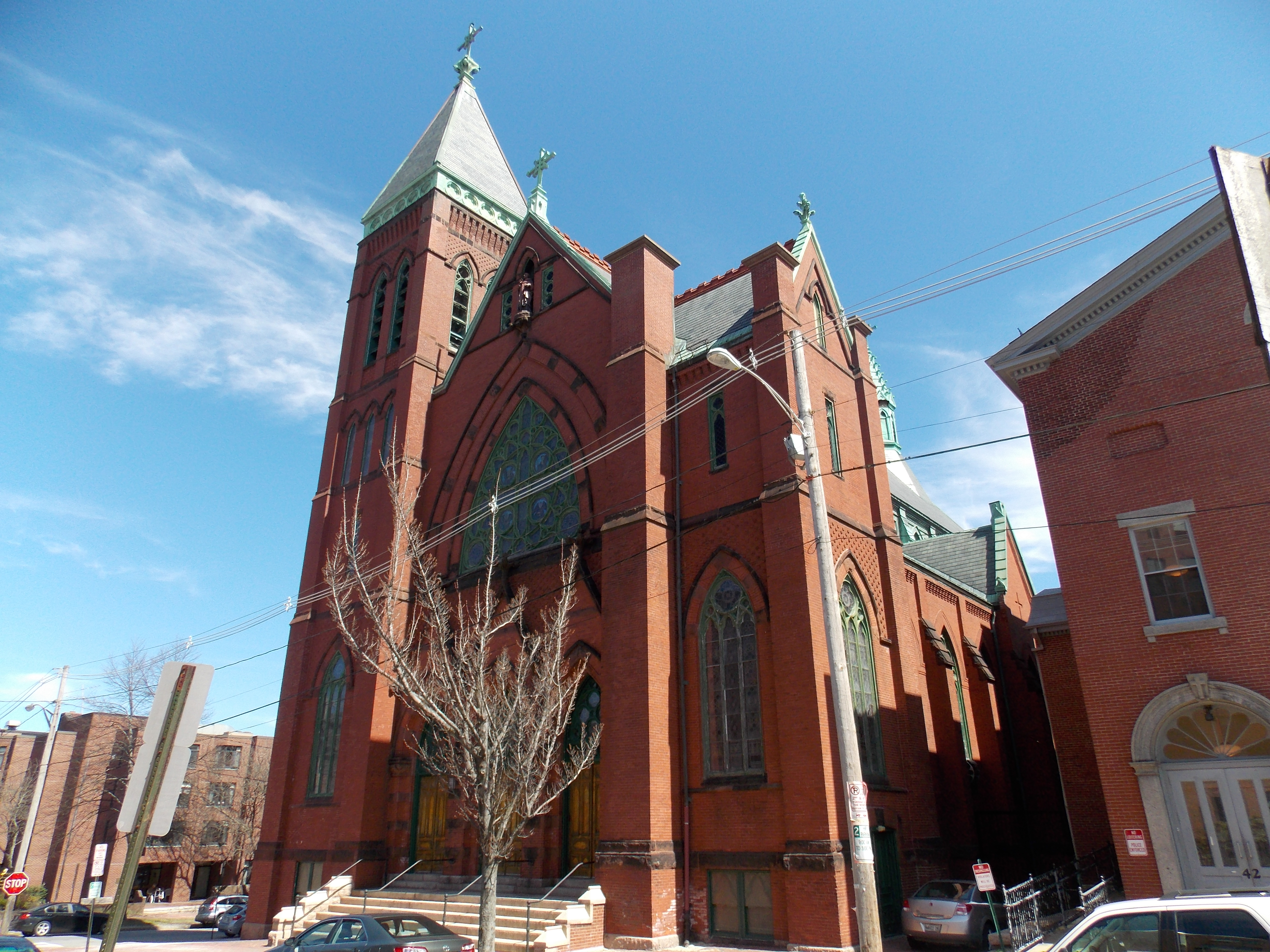
- Interactive map of the St. Dominic's Church area

General information
- Type: Church
- Location: 34 Gray Street, Portland, Maine
- Coordinates: 43.6504°N 70.2626°W
- Construction started: 1822
- Completed: 1833
- Owner: Maine Irish Heritage Center

St. Dominic's Church is an historic Catholic church building in Portland, Maine, located at the corner of Gray Street and State Street. When it was dedicated on August 11, 1833, it became the first Roman Catholic church in the city and the third in the state. Parishioners generally resided in the historically Irish neighborhoods of Gorham's Corner, Munjoy Hill (Portland) and Knightville (South Portland). Prior to the closing of the parish in 1997, it had been at one time one of the largest Irish-American Catholic parishes north of Boston. In 2003, the building was transferred to the newly formed Maine Irish Heritage Center.

== Renovation ==
In 2009, the MIHC received a $73,000 apportionment of Community Development Block Grant funds from the city in order to build a handicap-accessible elevator. In 2014, state historian Earle Shettleworth and the Maine Historic Preservation Commission announced that MIHC would receive a $10,000 grant for maintenance and renovations at the center.
