= American House (Boston) =

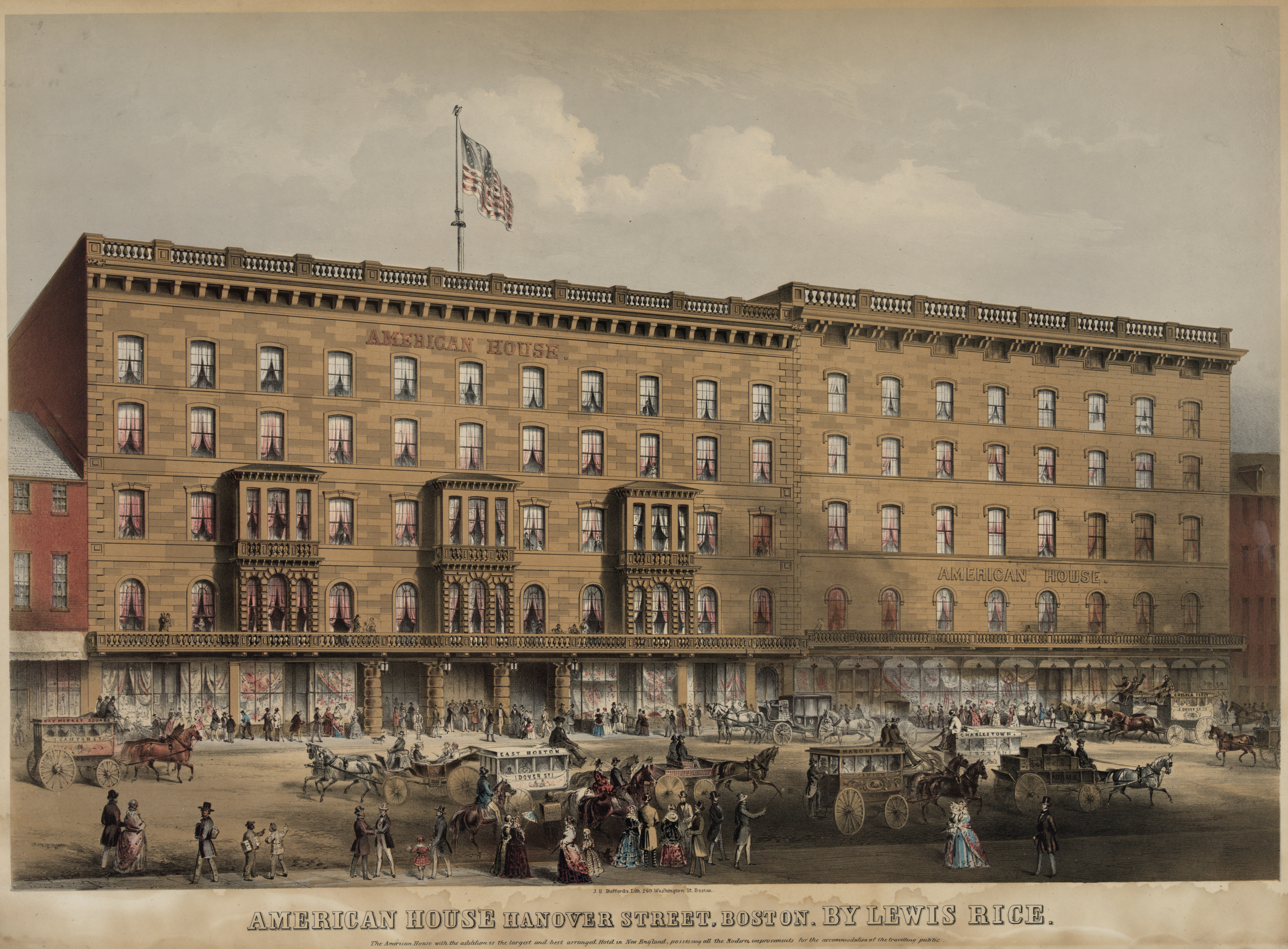
- American House, c. 1852

- Location within Boston

General information
- Type: Hotel
- Location: 56 Hanover Street; Boston, Massachusetts; United States
- Coordinates: 42.3608°N 71.0589°W
- Opened: 1835
- Renovated: 1851
- Demolished: 1935

Technical details
- Floor count: 6
- Floor area: 44,000 sq ft (4,100 m^{2})

Design and construction
- Architect: William Washburn (renovation)

The American House (established 1835) was a hotel in Boston, Massachusetts, located on Hanover Street. Abraham W. Brigham, Lewis Rice (1837–1874), Henry B. Rice (1868–1888), and Allen C. Jones (c. 1921) served as proprietors. In 1851 the building was expanded, to a design by Charles A. Alexander. In 1868 it had "the first hotel passenger elevator in Boston." By the 1860s it also had "billiard halls, telegraph office, and cafe." In the late 19th century it was described as "the headquarters of the shoe-and-leather trade" in the city. Guests of the hotel and restaurant included John Brown, Ralph Waldo Emerson, William Whitwell Greenough, Charles Savage Homer, Zadoc Long, and George Presbury Rowell. Many groups held meetings there, among them: Granite Cutters' International Association of America, Letter Carriers' Association, National Electric Light Association, and New England Shorthand Reporters' Association. The hotel closed in 1916, and re-opened under new management in 1918. It permanently closed on August 8, 1935, and the building was shortly afterwards demolished to make room for a parking lot. The John F. Kennedy Federal Building now occupies the site.

== Images ==
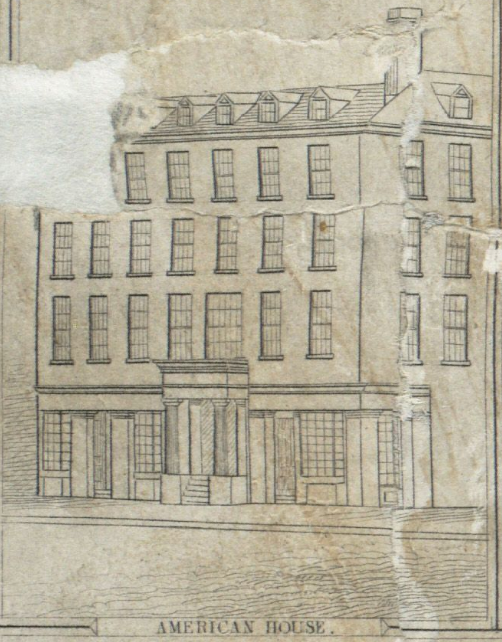
American House, 1835

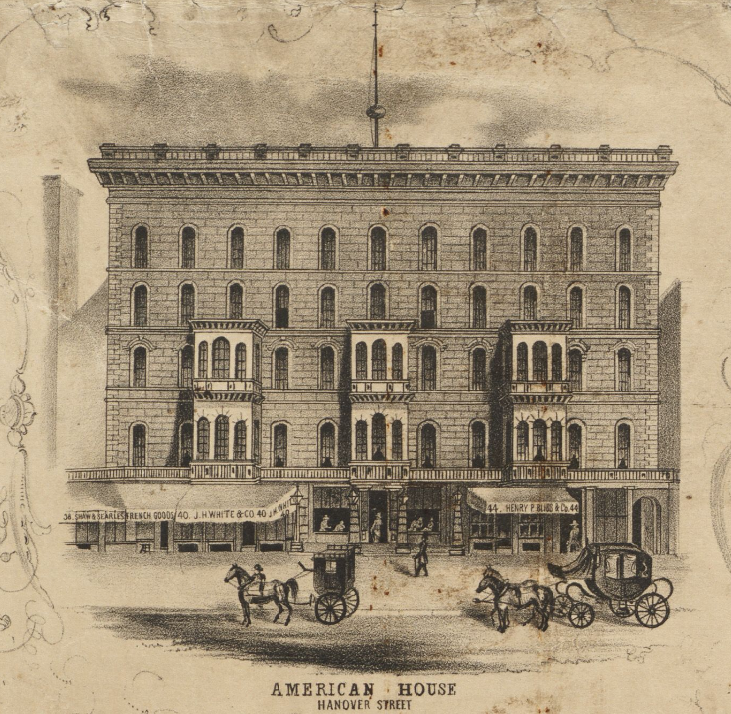
c. 1850

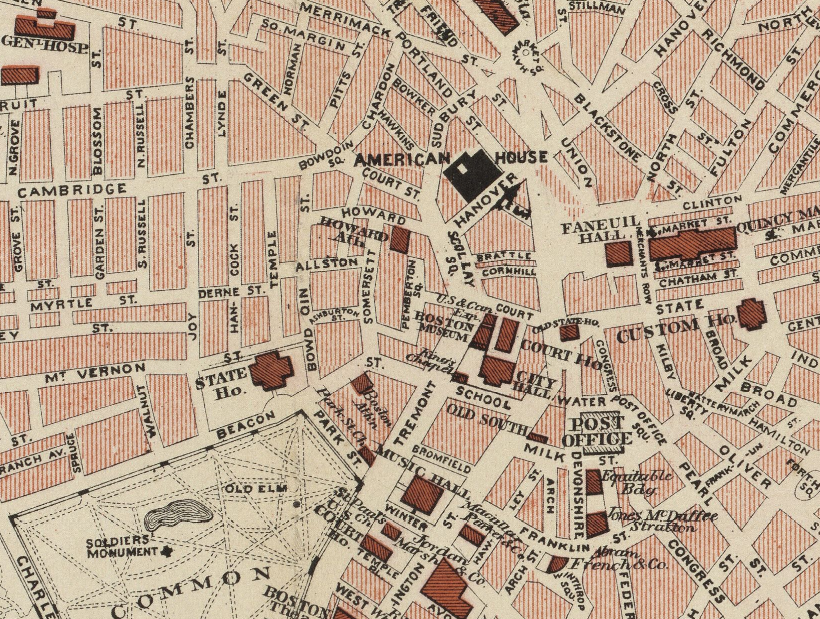
Map of Boston, showing location of American House, 1883

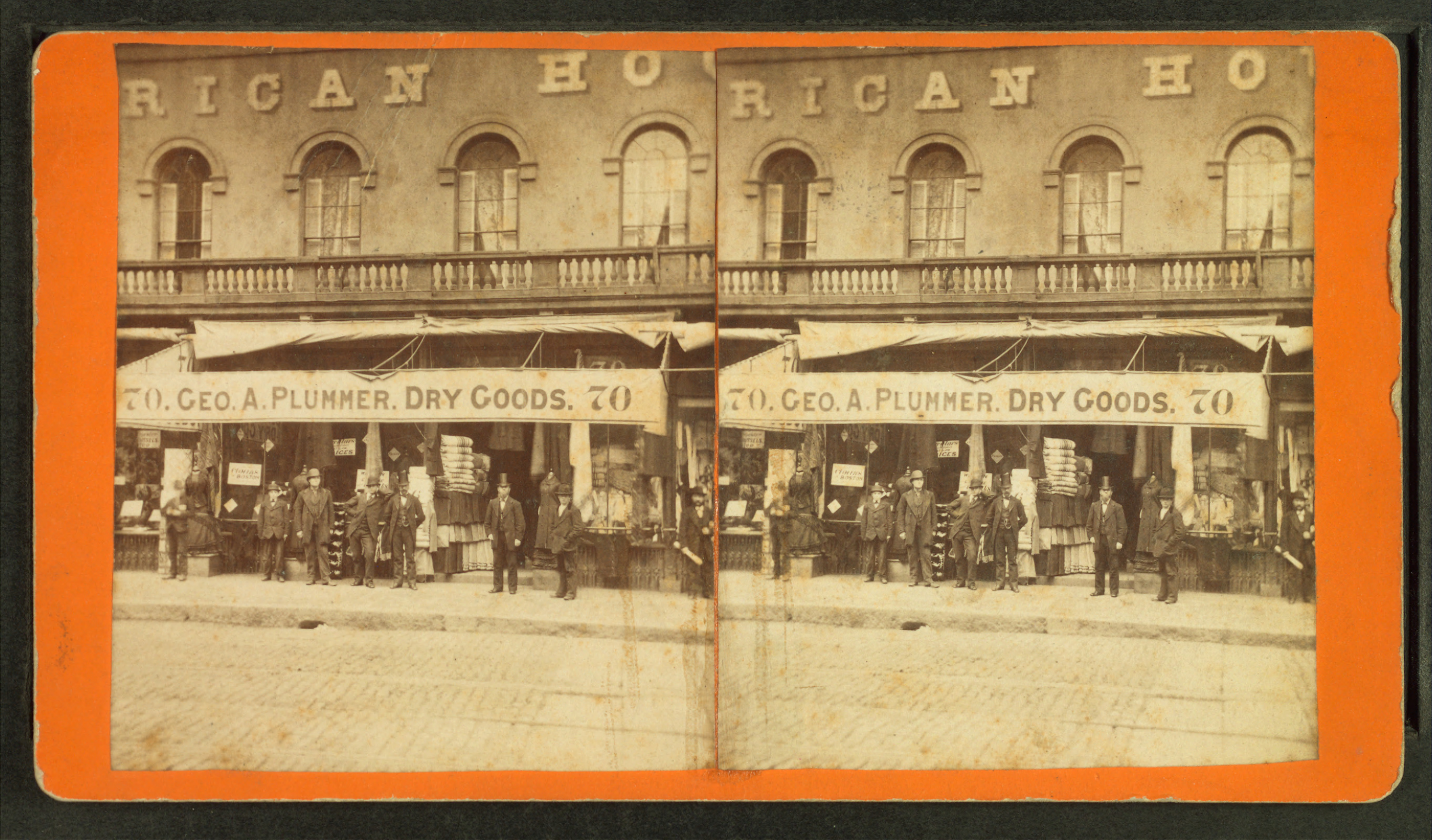
Geo. A. Plummer dry goods shop, in hotel building, 19th century

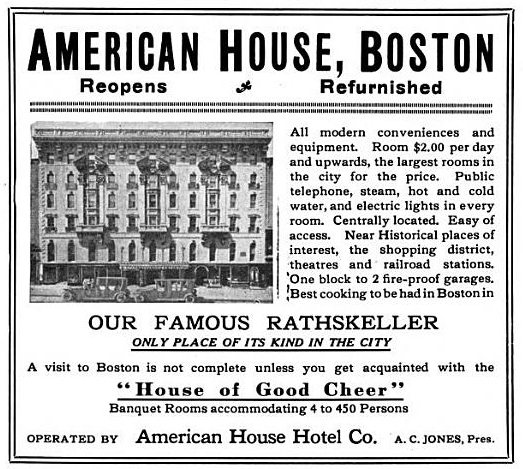
Advertisement for new American House, "refurnished," 1920
