= Joseph Holt Ingraham House =

Historic house in Maine, United States

- U.S. National Register of Historic Places
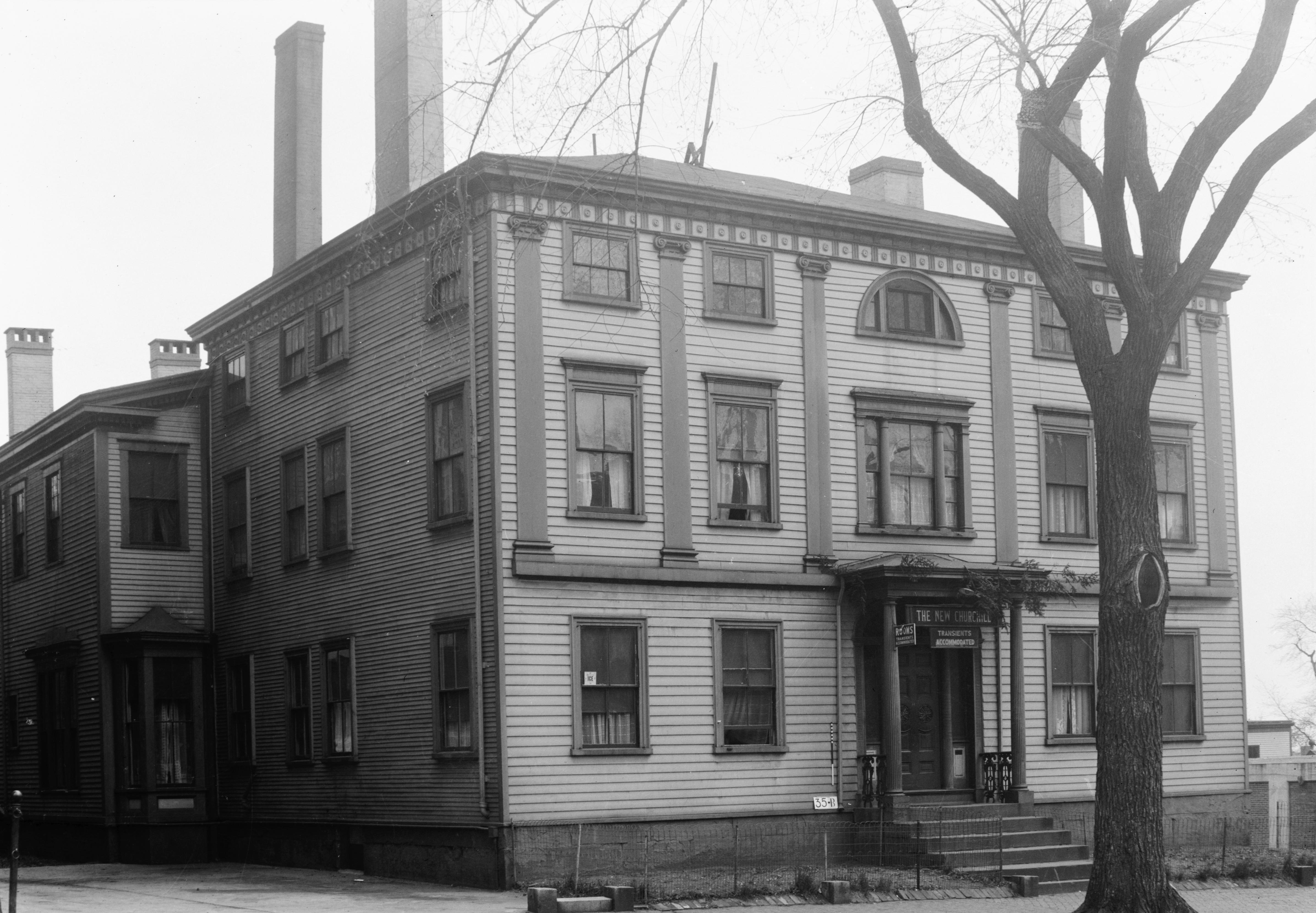
- Front of the house, 1936 HABS photo

- Location within Maine Location within the United States
- Location: 51 State Street, Portland, Maine
- Coordinates: 43°39′0″N 70°15′41″W
- Area: 1 acre (0.40 ha)
- Built: 1801
- Architect: Alexander Parris
- Architectural style: Federal
- NRHP reference No.: 73000116
- Added to NRHP: July 16, 1973

The Joseph Holt Ingraham House, also known as the Churchill and Dole House, is an historic house at 51 State Street in Portland, Maine. Built in 1801, it is an important early design by architect Alexander Parris. State Street, on which the house stands, was laid out by its first owner. The house was listed on the National Register of Historic Places in 1973.

== Description and history ==
The Ingraham House is located on the east side of Portland's West End neighborhood, on the northeast side of State Street, a short distance south of Danforth Street. It is a three-story wood-frame structure, with a hip roof, clapboard siding, and a granite foundation. The main facade is five bays wide, with symmetrical arrangement. The main entrance is at the center sheltered by a hip-roofed portico with Doric columns. The entry is flanked by sidelight windows and topped by an elliptical fanlight. Above the entrance is a three-part rectangular window on the second level, with a three-part half-round window on the third floor. Windows are otherwise sash, with smaller windows on the third floor. The interior of the house has little historic integrity; much of its original paneling was removed in the early 20th century, and was installed in Washington, D.C.'s Blair House.

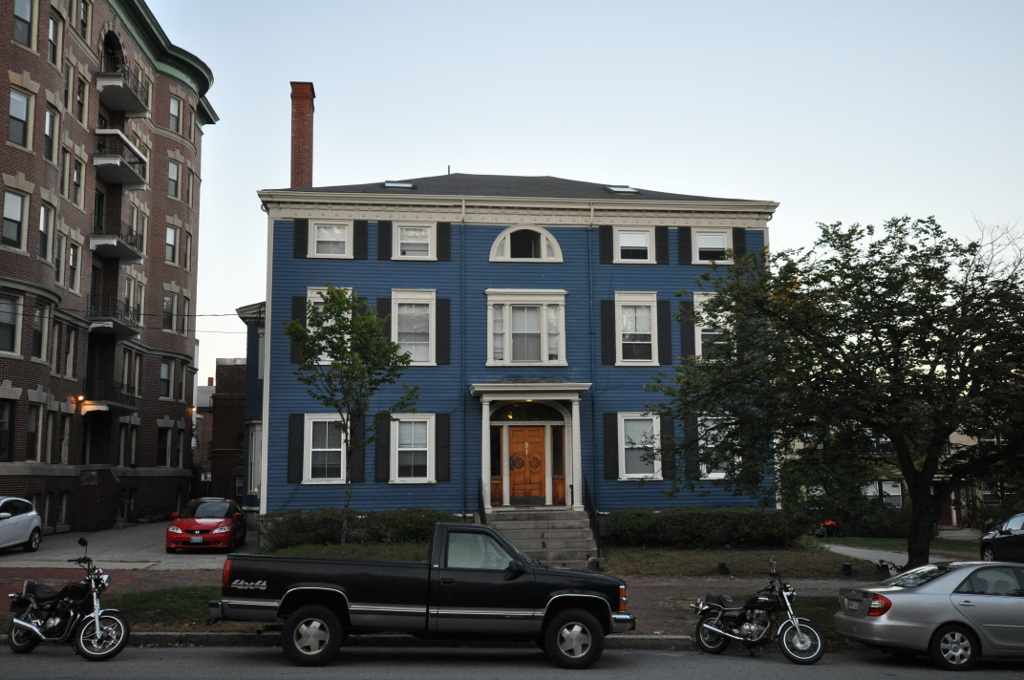
The house in 2018

The house was designed by Alexander Parris, then early in his career, and was built in 1801 for Joseph Holt Ingraham, a silversmith and businessman. The house, one of the oldest on the Portland peninsula, is one of three surviving works of Parris in the city, where he lived 1801–09 before achieving fame for his work in Boston and elsewhere. Later owners of the house include William Pitt Preble, a justice of the Maine Supreme Judicial Court, and James M. Churchill, a merchant and shipowner. In 1908, the house was converted into boarding house (called "The Churchill"); it is presently a multiunit apartment house.

== See also ==
- National Register of Historic Places listings in Portland, Maine
