= State Street Congregational Church =

Church in Maine, United States

Coordinates: 43°39′9″N 70°15′56″W

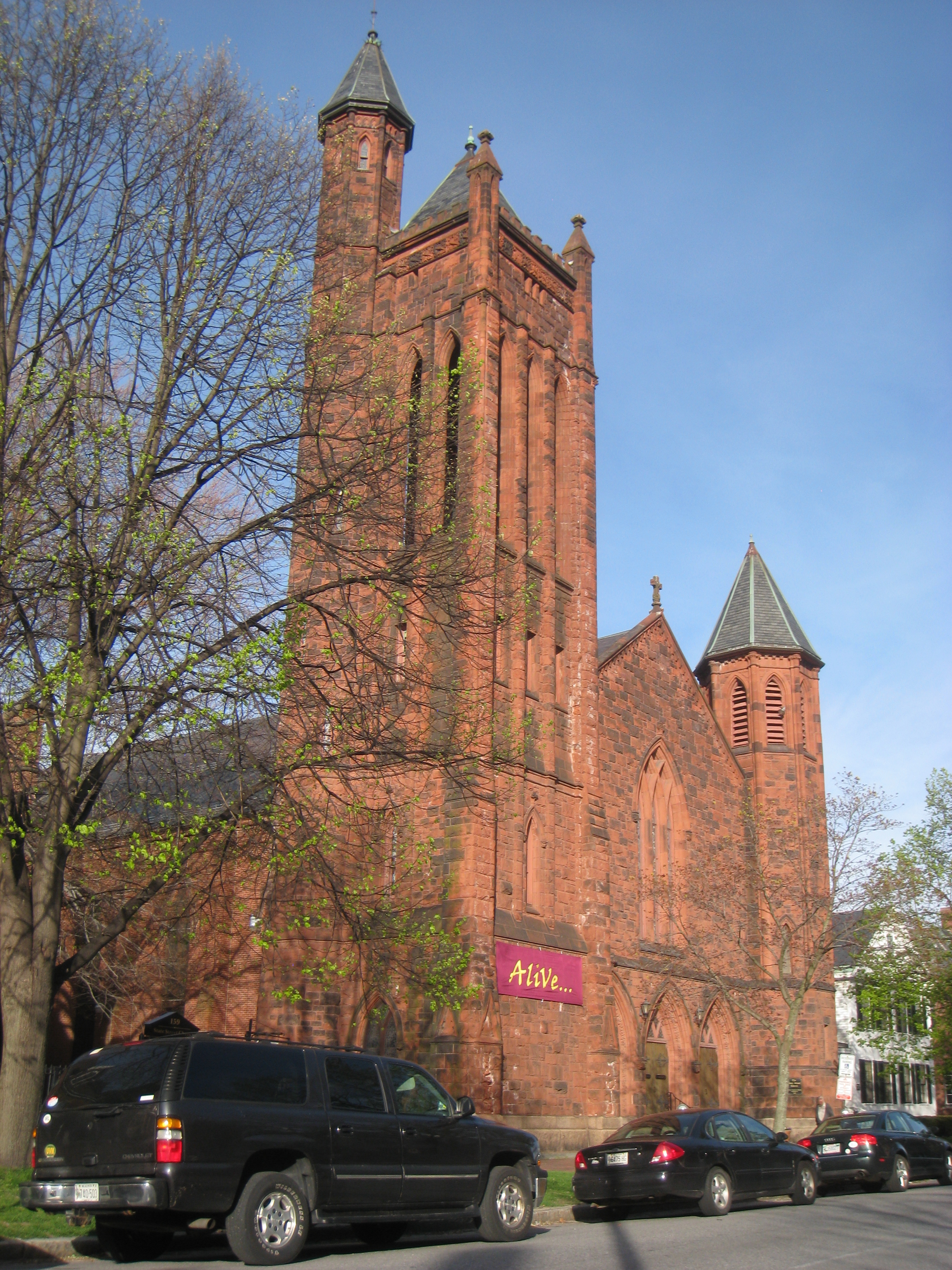

The State Street Congregational Church is a historic Congregational church on State Street in Portland, Maine, US. Also known as the State Street Church and the State Street United Church of Christ, it was designed by architect William Washburn and built in 1851. Since late 2022 or early 2023, the congregation has operated a homeless shelter for families. By 2025, it was operating as an overflow facility for Portland's municipal family shelter.
