= Samuel Smith Kilburn =

19th-century American engraver

Samuel Smith Kilburn (1831—1903) was an engraver in Boston, Massachusetts, in the 19th century. He trained with Abel Bowen. Kilburn's work appeared in popular periodicals such as Gleason's Pictorial. His business partners included Richard P. Mallory (Kilburn & Mallory) and Henry C. Cross. For many years Kilburn worked at 96 Washington Street in Boston (c.1852-1871); he lived in Newton, Massachusetts. Examples of his work are in the collections of the Boston Athenaeum and the Museum of Fine Arts Boston.

== Image gallery ==
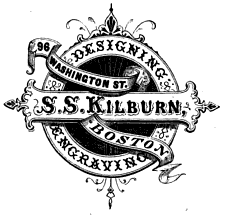
S.S. Kilburn, engraver, Washington St., Boston, ca.1865

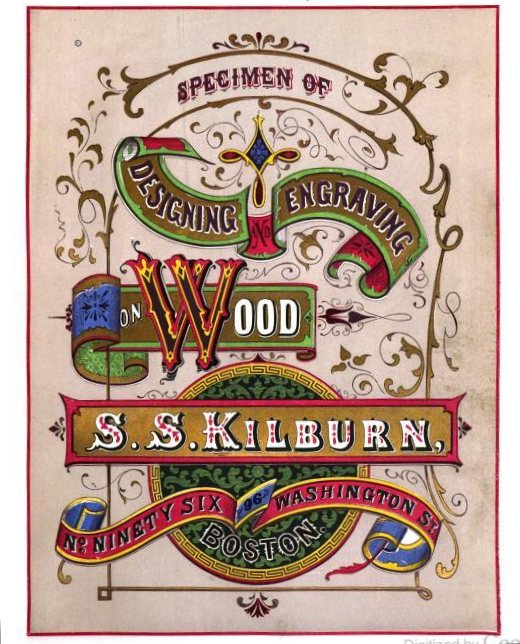
Kilburn's Specimens of Designing and Engraving on Wood, ca.1865

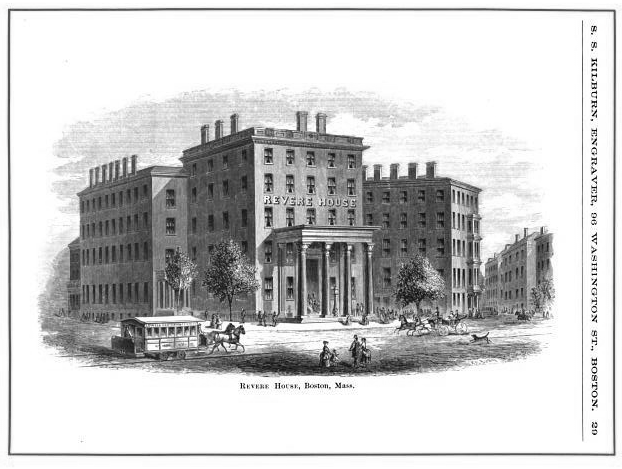
Revere House, Boston, ca.1865

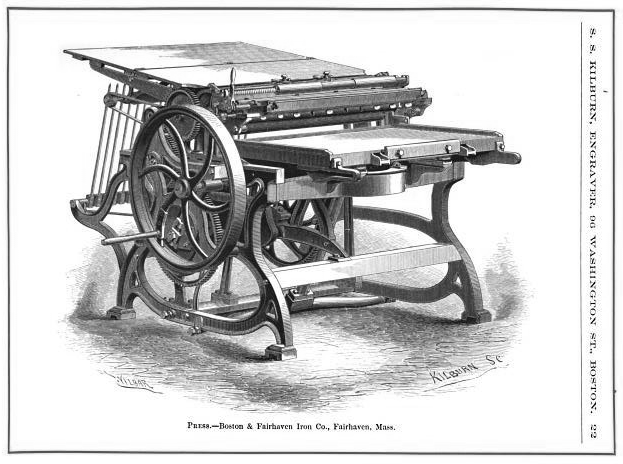
"Press-- Boston & Fairhaven Iron Co., Fairhaven, Mass.," ca.1865

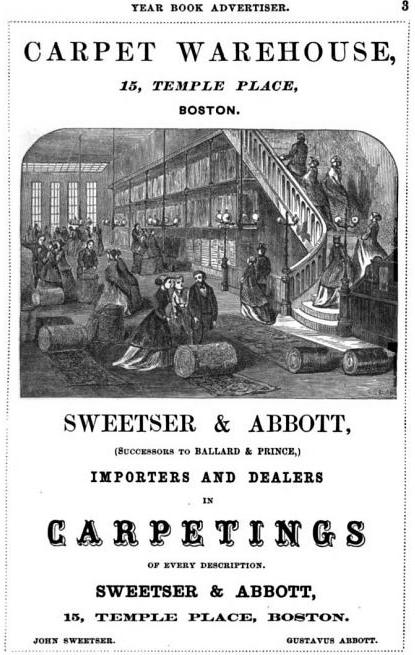
Ad for Sweetser & Abbott, carpet dealers, Temple Place, Boston, 1868
