= Arthur's Magazine =

American literary magazine

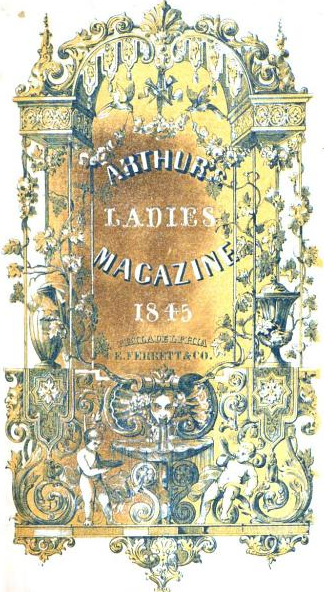
Frontispiece, Arthur's Magazine, 1845

Arthur's Magazine (1844–1846) was an American literary periodical published in Philadelphia in the 19th century. Edited by Timothy Shay Arthur, it featured work by Edgar A. Poe, J.H. Ingraham, Sarah Josepha Hale, Thomas G. Spear, and others. In May 1846 it was merged into Godey's Lady's Book.

A few years later Arthur would launch a new publication entitled Arthur's Home Magazine.
