= Charles A. Alexander =

American architect

- Born: February 1827; Charlestown, Massachusetts, U.S.
- Died: May 23, 1888 (aged 61); New York City, New York, U.S.
- Resting place: Grove Hill Cemetery, Waltham, Massachusetts, U.S.
- Occupation: Architect

Charles Albert Alexander (February 1827 – May 23, 1888) was an American architect active in the second half of the 19th century. He designed notable buildings in Boston, Portland (Maine), New York City and Chicago.

== Life and career ==
Alexander was born in February 1827, in Charlestown, Massachusetts, to Henry Foster Alexander and Mary Jackson.

In 1849, Alexander was listed as a partner of William Washburn, a Boston architect. One of his works was the renovation of the American House hotel in 1851, a site now occupied by the John F. Kennedy Federal Building in the city's Hanover Street.

After several years in Portland, Maine, after his divorce Alexander moved to New York City in 1863, but regularly visited Portland. It was during his period in New York that Alexander was elected to the American Institute of Architects. He was living near Madison Square, on East 25th Street.

In 1870, he moved to Chicago, shortly before its great fire.

Alexander married Mary Catherine Granger on September 2, 1849, in New Haven, Connecticut. Two years later, the couple temporarily relocated to Portland, Maine, with a view to moving there permanently.

Their son, Philip, was born in Boston in November 1851, shortly after which the couple completed their move to Portland, where they lived in one side of the Jonah Perley House on Danforth Street.

A daughter, Maude Evangeline, was born in 1858. The following year, the Alexanders purchased a lot at the corner of Vaughan and Danforth Streets.

In early 1862, Mary filed for a divorce, citing mental and physical abuse from her husband. She and the children had moved back to Boston in late 1859. The Maine Supreme Court ruled in favor of Mary and granted her custody of the couple's children. She sold the home to Charles for $1500, and remained in the Boston area with the children. She died in 1885, following a fall.

=== Death ===
Alexander died on May 23, 1888, at the Brevoort House in New York, where he was on a visit. He was 61. He is believed to have been buried in Waltham, Massachusetts, beside his parents at Grove Hill Cemetery.

== Selected notable works ==
- American House, Boston, Massachusetts (1851; renovation)
- Capt. S. C. Blanchard House, Yarmouth, Maine (1855)
- Chestnut Street Methodist Church, Portland, Maine (1856)
- Bramhall, Portland, Maine (1856)
- Goddard Mansion, Cape Elizabeth, Maine (1859)
