= Maine State Route 77 =

State highway in Cumberland County, Maine, US

State Route 77

Route information
- Maintained by MaineDOT
- Length: 12.34 mi (19.86 km)

Major junctions
- South end: SR 207 in Scarborough
- US 1A in Portland
- North end: SR 22 / SR 25 in Portland

Location
- Country: United States
- State: Maine
- Counties: Cumberland

Highway system
- Maine State Highway System; Interstate; US; State; Auto trails; Lettered highways
← SR 73	→ SR 85

State Route 77 (abbreviated SR 77) is part of Maine's system of numbered state highways, located in eastern Cumberland County. It runs for 12.3 miles (19.8 km) from SR 207 in Scarborough to the intersection of Park Avenue and State Street in Portland (a terminus it shares with SR 22 and SR 25).

== Route description ==
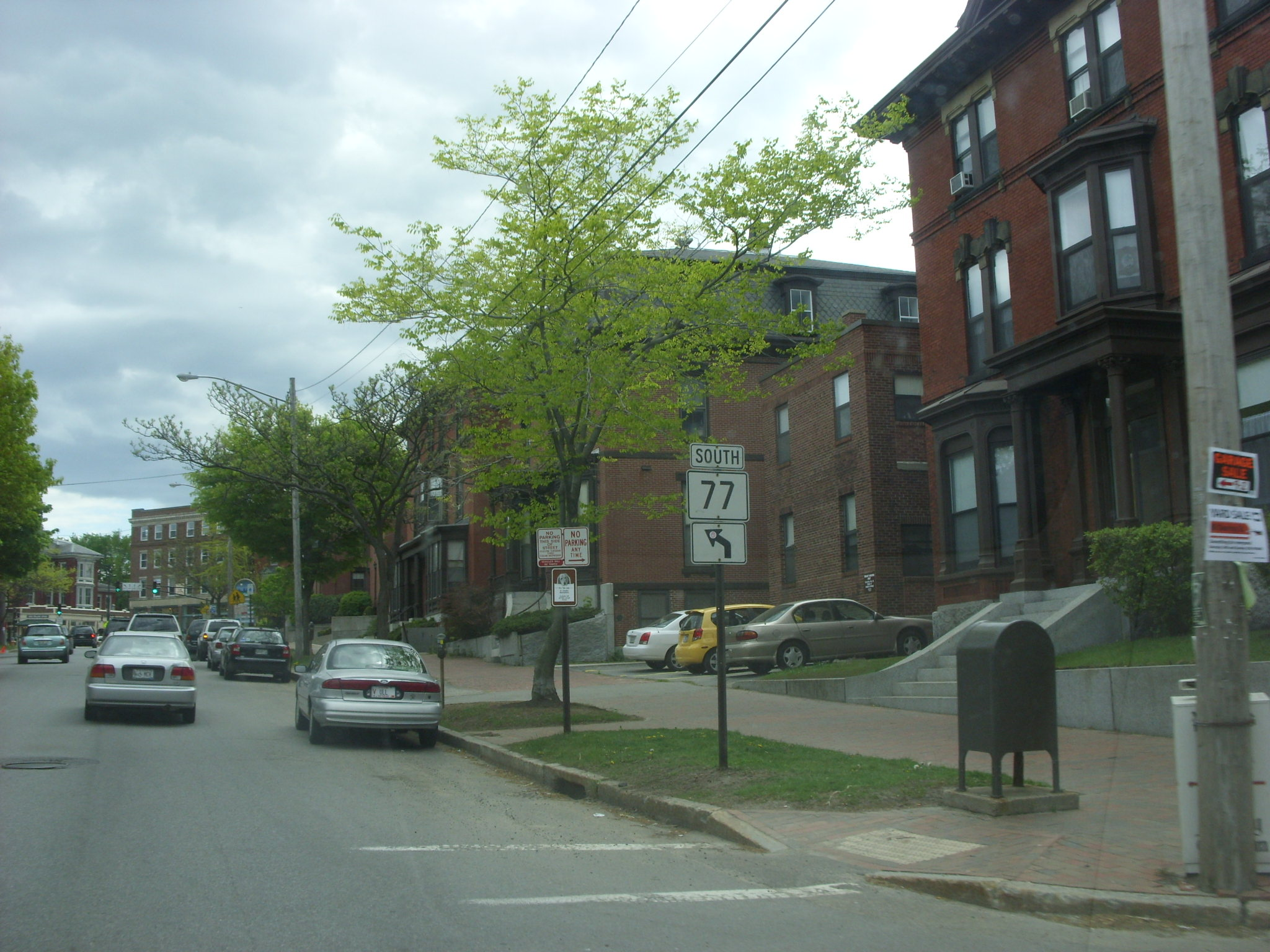
SR 77 in downtown Portland

SR 77 begins in Scarborough at SR 207 near Scarborough Beach State Park. It runs east and north along the coastline, through the town of Cape Elizabeth. SR 77 passes through eastern South Portland before crossing the Fore River on the Casco Bay Bridge into downtown Portland.

Upon entering Portland proper, SR 77 crosses over U.S. Route 1A (US 1A) with indirect access available via connecting streets. The highway splits into a one-way pair, High Street northbound and State Street southbound. The SR 77 designation continues north for another 0.9 miles (1.4 km) before terminating at Park Street. This intersection is the signed eastern terminus of SR 22, and administratively SR 25, although the latter is not signed. In addition, the highway also passes Cumberland Avenue just to the south, the former southern terminus of SR 26. The one-way northbound alignment of SR 77 on High Street is not officially part of the route as designated, because State Street was formerly a two-way street prior to 1972.

== Junction list ==
The entire route is in Cumberland County.

Location	mi	km	Destinations	Notes
Scarborough	0.00	0.00	SR 207 north (Black Point Road) – Scarborough, Prouts Neck	Southern terminus of SR 77 and SR 207
Fore River	10.66– 11.60	17.16– 18.67	Casco Bay Bridge	
Portland	11.43	18.39	US 1A (Commercial Street)	Southbound entrance only; indirect access via connecting roads
Portland	12.34	19.86	SR 22 / SR 25 west (Park Avenue) – South Portland, Westbrook	Northern terminus of SR 77; eastern terminus of SR 22 and SR 25 (SR 25 is unsigned)
1.000 mi = 1.609 km; 1.000 km = 0.621 mi: Incomplete access
