= Veterans Memorial Bridge (Portland, Maine) =

Coordinates: 43.6433°N 70.2839°W

Veterans Memorial Bridge is a bridge in Maine, United States, connecting the cities of Portland and South Portland. The bridge spans the Fore River and is part of U.S. Route 1. The original Veterans Memorial Bridge was built in 1954, and was described as 'rapidly deteriorating' prior to its demolition. Designated a top infrastructure priority by Maine state government, a new bridge was built between 2010 and 2012. General contractor Reed & Reed, of Woolwich, was awarded the rebuilding contractor. Reed & Reed estimated the new bridge would stand for a century.
