= Chestnut Street Methodist Church (Portland, Maine) =

Historic church in Maine, United States

- U.S. National Register of Historic Places
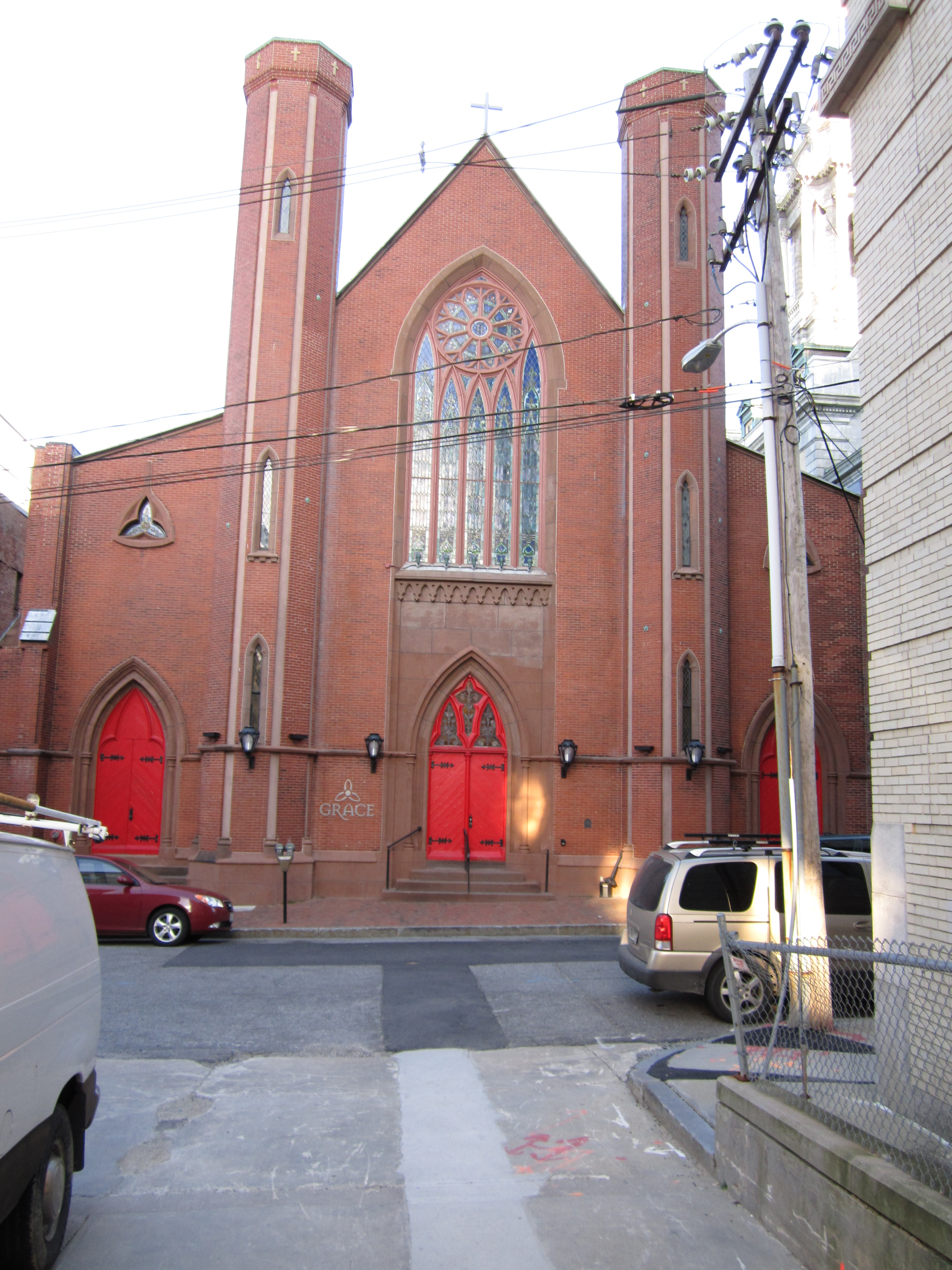
- Pictured in 2011

- Location within Maine Location within the United States
- Location: 15 Chestnut St., Portland, Maine
- Coordinates: 43°39′34″N 70°15′30″W
- Area: 1 acre (0.40 ha)
- Built: 1856
- Architect: Charles A. Alexander
- Architectural style: Gothic Revival
- NRHP reference No.: 77000063
- Added to NRHP: October 20, 1977

The former Chestnut Street Methodist Church is an historic church building at 15 Chestnut Street in Portland, Maine. Built in 1856, it is rare in the city as an early example of Gothic Revival architecture, and is one of the few surviving works of Charles A. Alexander, a popular architect of the period. The building was listed on the National Register of Historic Places in 1977. It now houses an event venue.

== Description and history ==
The former Chestnut Street Church building is set in the city center, directly behind Portland City Hall on the east side of Chestnut Street. It is a single story masonry structure, built out of pressed brick with brownstone trim. Its slate roof is steeply pitched at the center, with a gentler slope over the outer aisles of the nave. Its foundation is brick, faced in brownstone to a height of 2 feet (0.61 m). Its walls are buttressed, with Gothic arched windows between the buttresses on the side walls. The main facade is symmetrical, with a pair of equal-height towers flanking the central gable. The towers originally had more elaborate spires, but these were removed for safety reasons in the 1950s, as were similar spires on the buttresses. There are three entrances, one at the center between the towers, and one each on the side aisles, all set in Gothic arched openings.

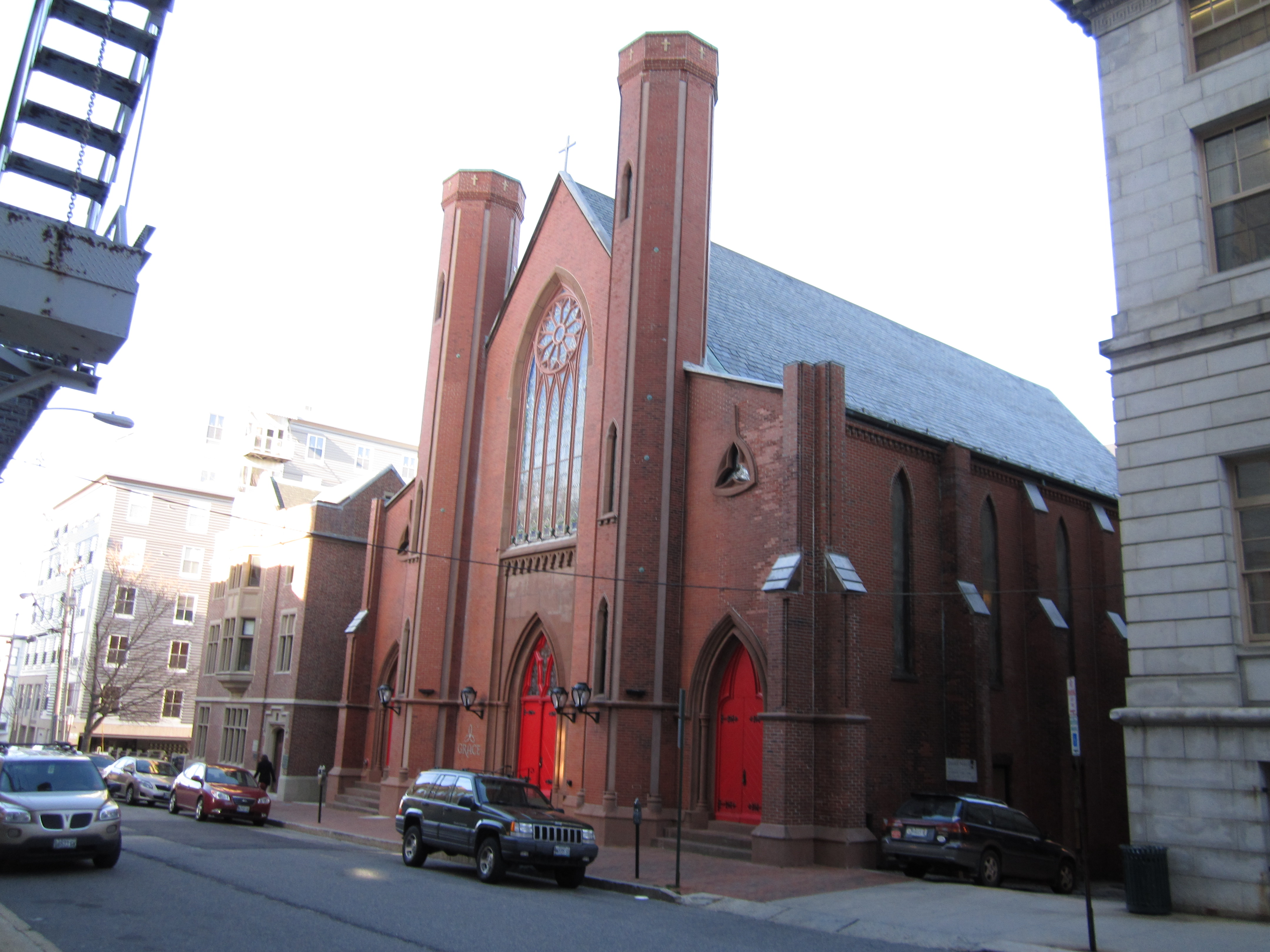
Side view

The church was built in 1856 for a Methodist congregation that had been meeting on the site since 1808. It is the first Methodist church into which an organ was installed. The building was designed by Charles A. Alexander, who designed a number of high-profile buildings in Portland in the 1850s, all of the others having either been demolished or significantly altered. The early Gothic style is also rare in Portland, as many buildings from the 1850s and early 1860s were lost in the 1866 fire.

In 1904, the Maine Women's Suffragist Association held their 24th annual convention at the church. The building was restored and converted into Grace restaurant in 2009 and into an event venue in 2019.

== See also ==
- National Register of Historic Places listings in Portland, Maine
