= Revere House =

Upscale hotel in Boston (1847–1912)

Coordinates: 42°21′40.23″N 71°3′46.43″W

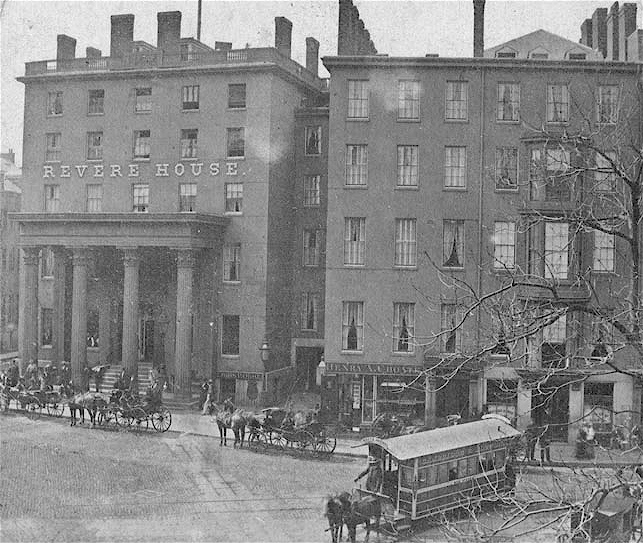
Revere House, Bowdoin Square, 19th century

Revere House (1847–1912) was an upscale hotel in 19th-century Boston, Massachusetts, located on Bowdoin Square in the West End. The building was destroyed by fire in 1912.

== Brief history ==
William Washburn designed the hotel building, constructed in 1847 on the former site of the house of Boston merchant Kirk Boott. The hotel was a project of the Massachusetts Charitable Mechanic Association. The association named their new hotel after Paul Revere, one of the founders of the group.

=== Notable guests ===
Some considered Revere House "Boston's most prestigious hotel. It hosted the likes of writer Charles Dickens, singer Jenny Lind ("The Swedish Nightingale"). ... Famed orator Daniel Webster often used the portico to address crowds at political rallies." Other notable guests: Ulysses S. Grant, Millard Fillmore, Franklin Pierce, Andrew Johnson, William Tecumseh Sherman, Walt Whitman, Edward VII, Emperor Pedro II of Brazil, Philip Sheridan, the Iwakura Mission of Japan, and singers Christina Nilsson and Adelina Patti. Grand Duke Alexei Alexandrovich of Russia stayed at the Revere House in December 1871 when he visited Boston as part of his grand tour of the United States.

=== Ownership and management ===
Through the years, owners included Otis Norcross, Frederick W. Lincoln, Uriel Crocker, Nathaniel J. Bradlee. Paran Stevens served as manager for many years. Management companies overseeing hotel operations included Chapin, Gurney & Co.; C.B. Ferrin; and beginning in 1885, J.F. Morrow & Co.

== Images ==
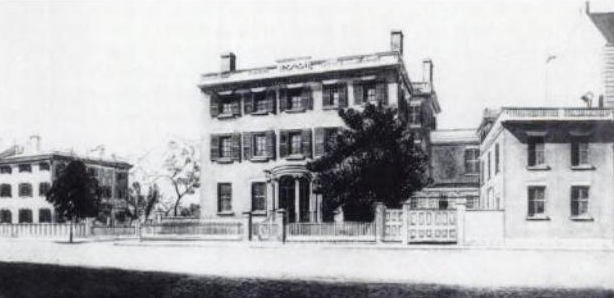
The residence of Kirk Boott, built in 1804 and rebuilt in 1846-47 as the Revere House

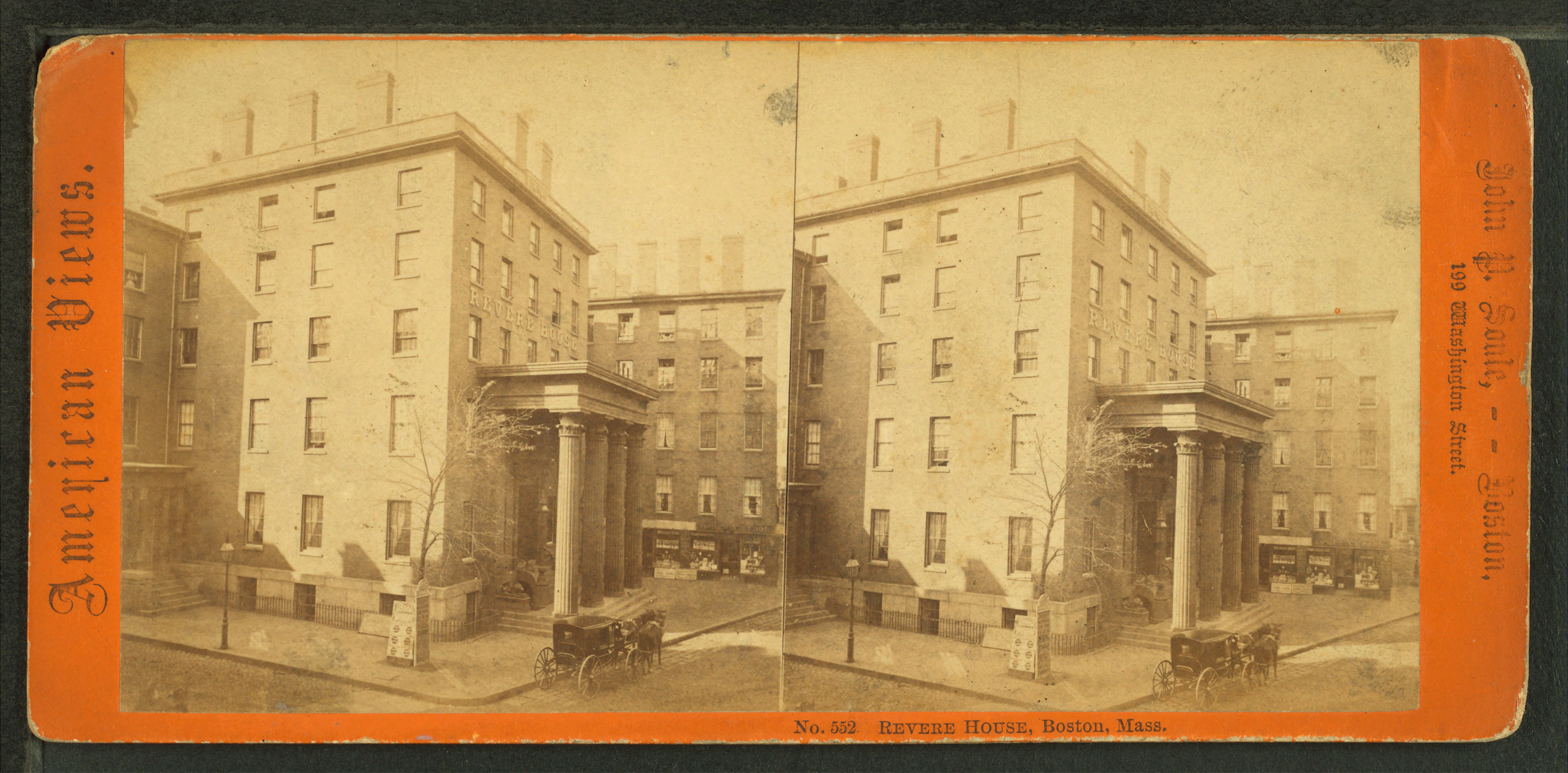
19th-century stereoview

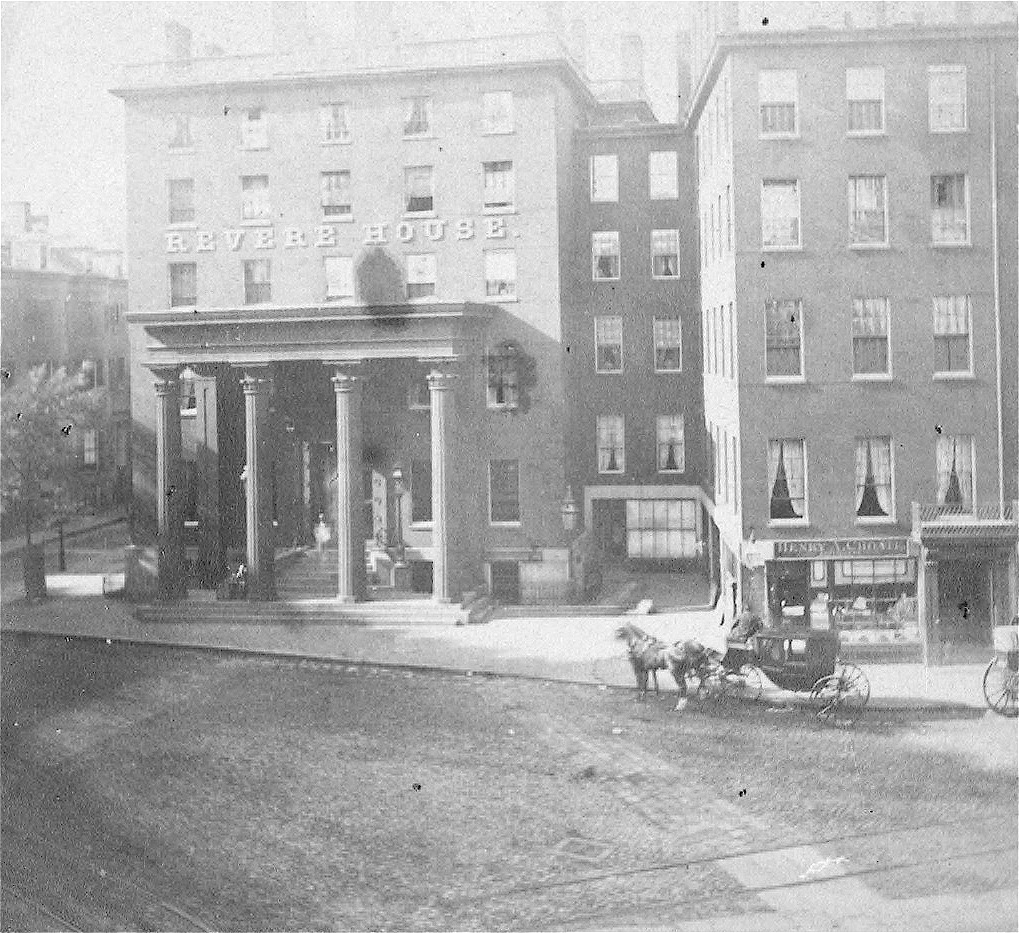
Revere House, Bowdoin Square, 19th century

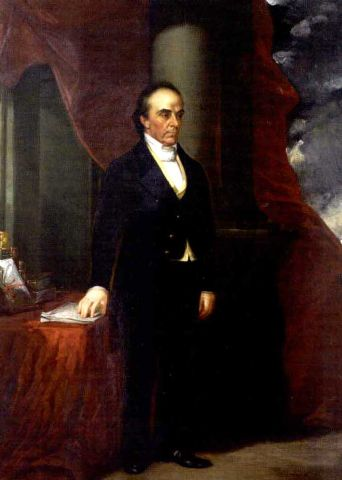
Portrait of Daniel Webster by Albert Gallatin Hoit, "which hung for years in the Revere House, Boston."

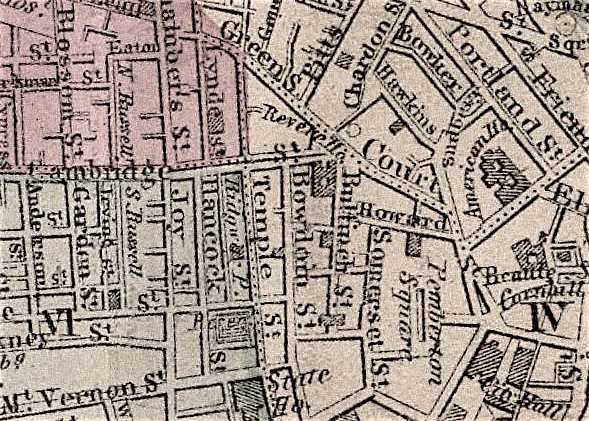
Detail of 1871 map of Boston, showing Revere House in Bowdoin Square

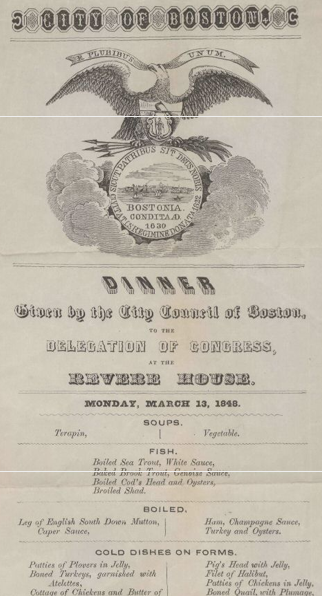
Detail of menu from dinner given by Boston City Council, 1848
