= James Henry Ingraham =

Civil rights leader

- Occupation: Civil rights leader
- Known for: Leading black soldiers in the American Civil War and participating in the Louisiana Constitutional Convention

James Henry Ingraham was an African American who served as an officer in the American Civil War, state legislator, and a leader of the civil rights movement in Louisiana. He was born into slavery and gained his freedom before the war.

== Military service ==
Ingraham joined the Louisiana Native Guards, a Union Army regiment composed of free blacks and former slaves. He commanded the 1st Battalion of the 1st Regiment of the Native Guards, which fought in the Siege of Port Hudson in 1863.

== Civil rights activism ==
After the war, Ingraham became a prominent civil rights activist in Louisiana. He was president of the Convention of Colored People of Louisiana, which met in January 1865 to demand equal rights and suffrage for black citizens. He also attended the National Negro Convention in Syracuse, New York, in October 1864, where he represented Louisiana.

Ingraham lived in New Orleans, where he helped establish Central Congregational United Church in Christ on Bienville Street, one of the first black churches in the city. He also served as president of the Louisiana Equal Rights League, an organization that advocated for the civil and political rights of black Louisianans.

In 1867, Ingraham was elected as a delegate to the Louisiana Constitutional Convention, which was convened to draft a new constitution for the state under the Reconstruction policy of Congress. He was one of the 49 black delegates out of the total 98, and he signed the constitution that was adopted in 1868. The constitution granted universal male suffrage, abolished property qualifications for office, established a public school system, and prohibited racial discrimination in public accommodations.

== See also ==
- André Cailloux
