= Joseph Holt Ingraham (silversmith) =

American silversmith (1752–1841)

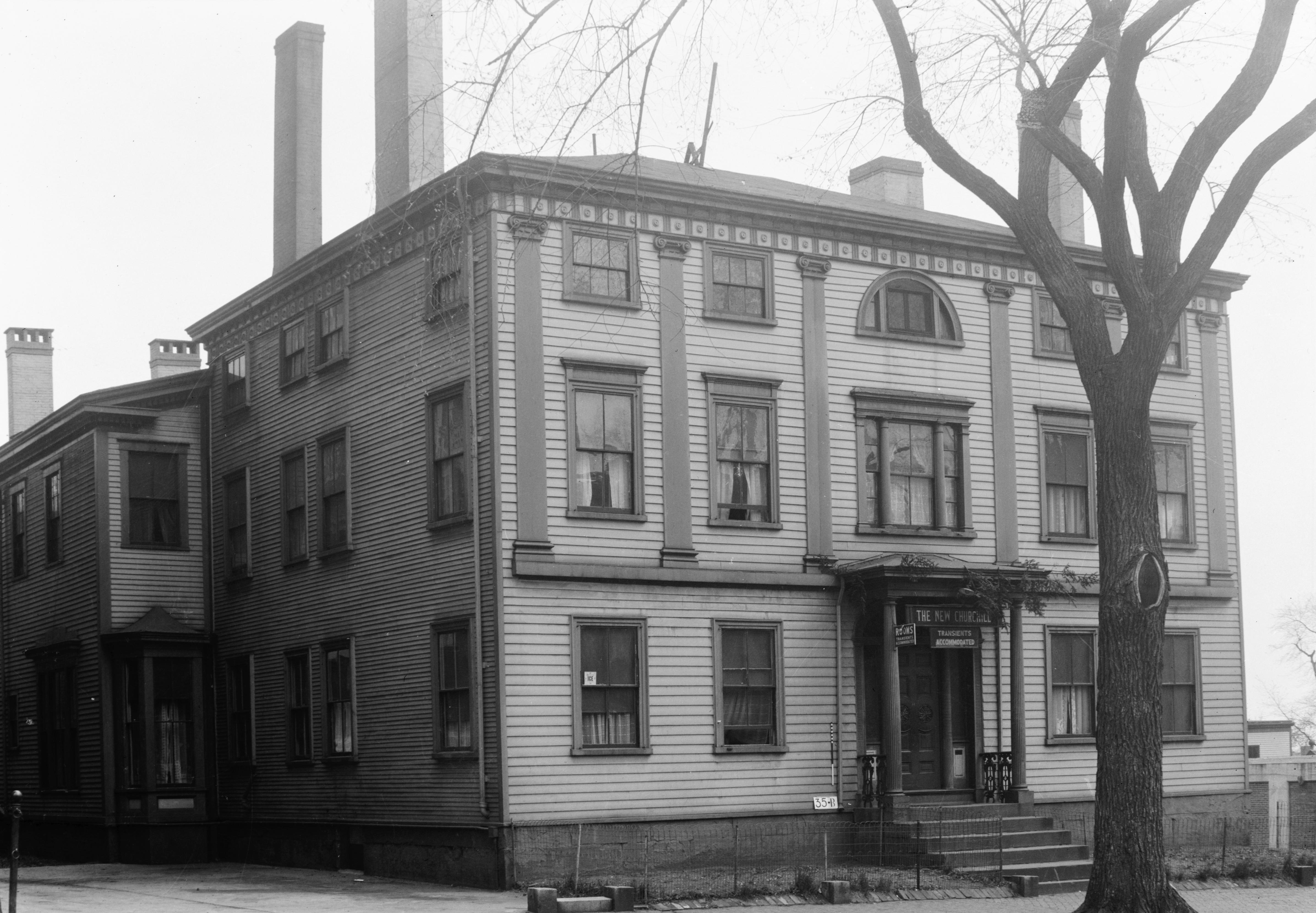
- The Joseph Holt Ingraham House in Portland, Maine
- Born: February 10, 1752; York, Province of Massachusetts Bay
- Died: October 30, 1841 (aged 89); Portland, Maine, U.S.
- Occupation: Silversmith

Joseph Holt Ingraham (February 10, 1752 – October 30, 1841) was an American silversmith and businessman based in Portland, Maine. He was responsible for laying out Portland's State Street, now part of Maine State Route 77. His former home on State Street, built in 1801, is now known as the Joseph Holt Ingraham House and is listed on the National Register of Historic Places. He also built the city's Ingraham Wharf.

He was the grandfather of writer Joseph Holt Ingraham.

== Life and career ==
Ingraham was born in York, Province of Massachusetts Bay, in 1752, to Edward Ingraham and Lydia Holt.

He moved to Portland, Province of Massachusetts Bay, around 1768, aged sixteen. He established a silversmith trade there after working with John Butler. He served as a selectman for eleven years, and represented the city in the General Court of Massachusetts for ten.

In 1775, he married Abigail Milk, with whom he had one child, son James.

Abigail died in 1783, and Ingraham remarried, to Lydia Stone, of Brunswick, Maine, in 1786. They had one child, William Stone, before Abigail's death.

He married a third time, to Ann Tate, in 1789. They had eleven children.

In 1793, he completed the construction of Ingraham Wharf (later known as Commercial Wharf) on Portland's Commercial Street, at the foot of Lime Street. The wharf (and Lime Street) has since been demolished.

He began laying out today's State Street in 1799 and gave it to the city. He also laid out Market Street from Middle Street to Fore Street.

He built a home at today's 51 State Street in 1801. Known as the Joseph Holt Ingraham House (and the Churchill and Dole House), it was designed by Alexander Parris.

In 1805, Ingraham donated land, at the corner of Milk Street and Market Street, to the City of Portland to be used as a marketplace. The Portland Armory was built on the land almost a century later.

== Death ==
Ingraham died at home, aged 89, in 1841. He was interred in the Ingraham Tomb in Portland's Eastern Cemetery. Ann, who survived him by three years, was buried beside him.
