= Joseph Holt Ingraham (writer) =

American author (1809–1860)

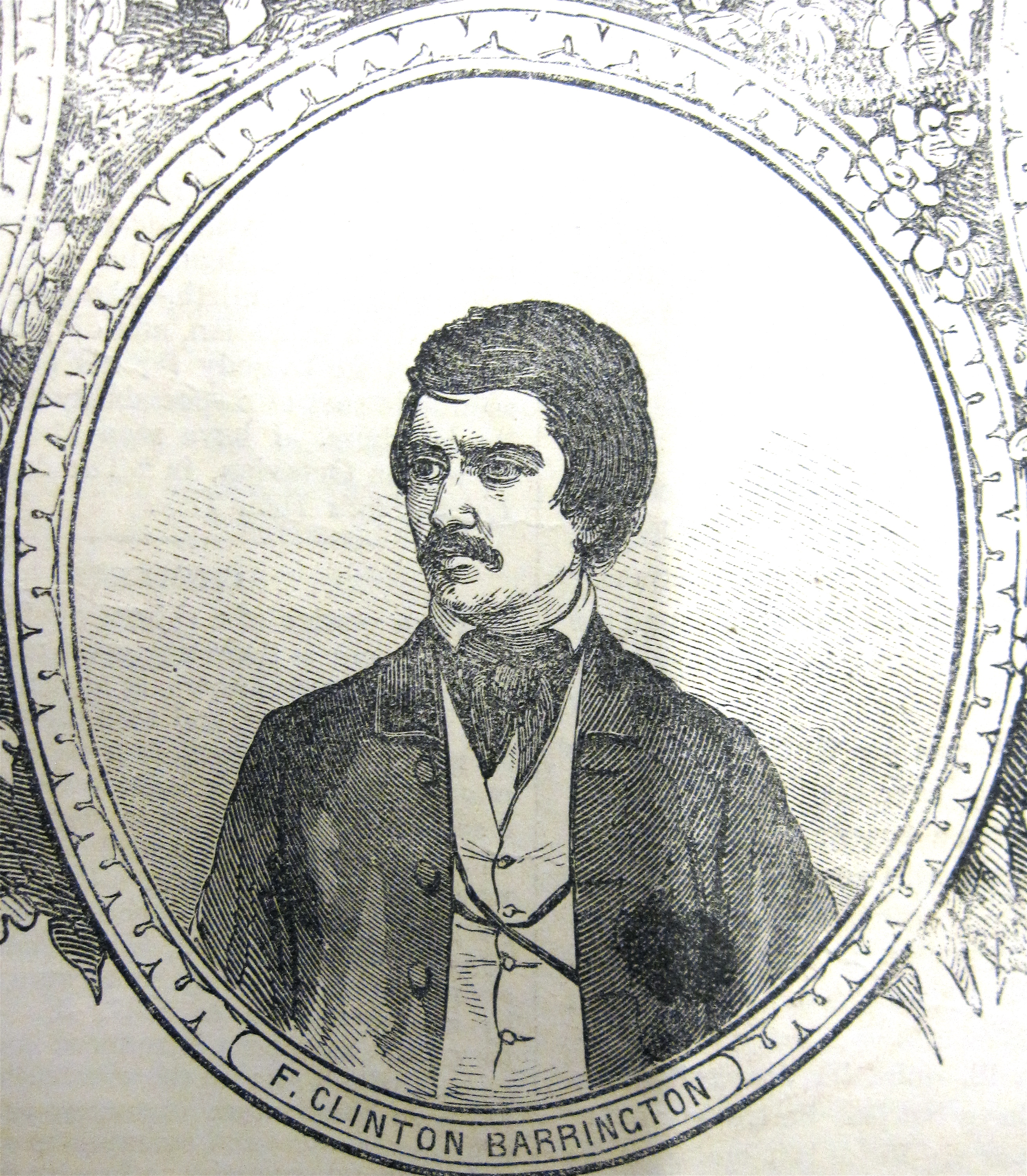
Portrait of F. Clinton Barrington (Joseph Holt Ingraham), 1852

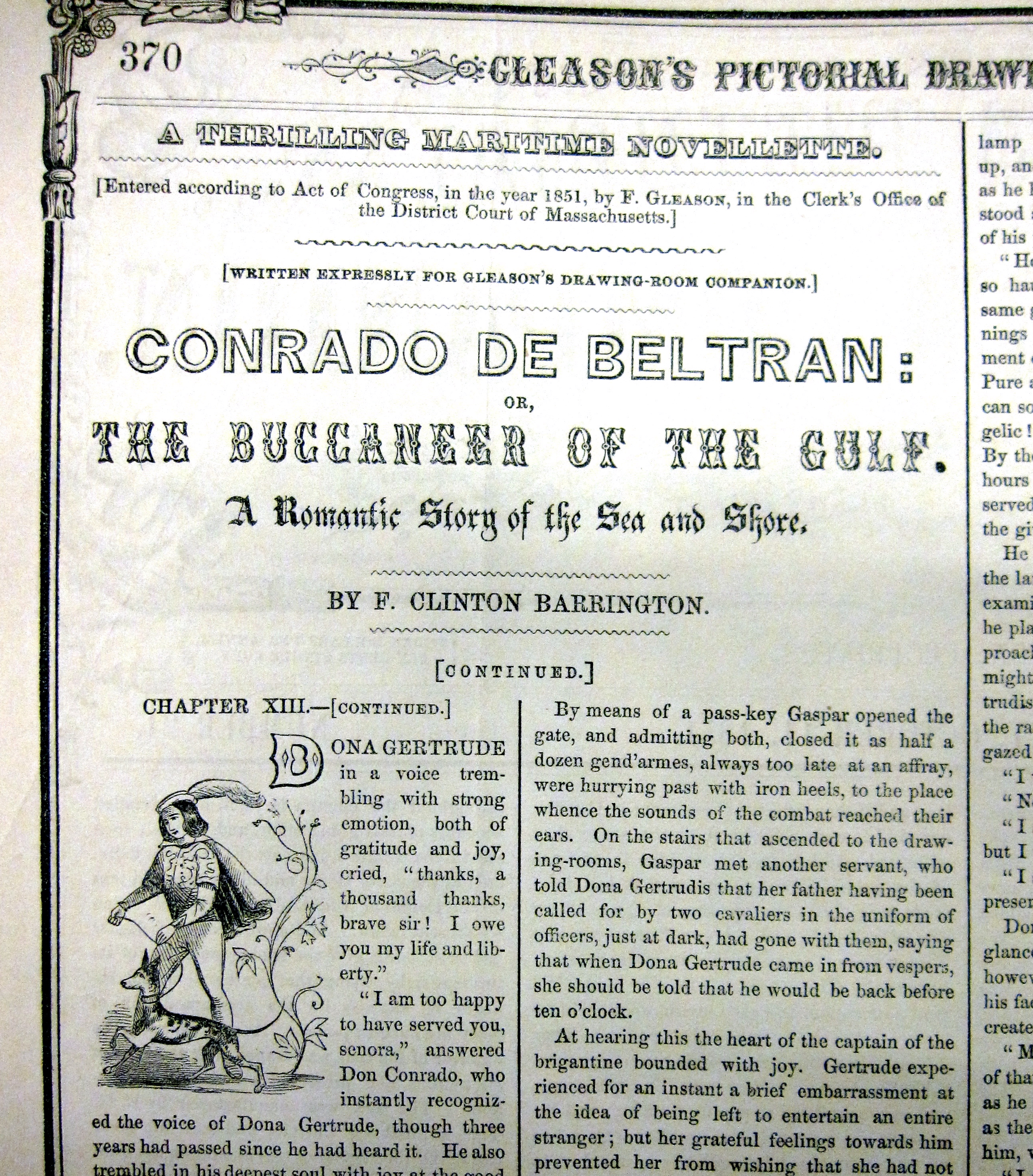
Excerpt from Conrado de Beltran, 1854

Joseph Holt Ingraham (January 26, 1809 – December 18, 1860) was an American writer.

Ingraham was born in Portland, Maine. He spent several years at sea, then worked as a teacher of languages in Mississippi. In the 1840s he published work in Arthur's Magazine. He became an Episcopal clergyman on March 7, 1852.

In Natchez, Ingraham married Mary Brooks, a cousin of Phillips Brooks.

Under the pen-name F. Clinton Barrington he wrote stories for popular publications such as Gleason's Pictorial Drawing-Room Companion. He met Henry Wadsworth Longfellow in 1846 and told him that he "has written eighty novels, and of these twenty during the last year."

Ingraham died at the age of 51, in Holly Springs, Mississippi, from an accidental self-inflicted gunshot wound in the vestibule of his church.

Ingraham wrote a series of three epistolary novels on biblical themes; The Pillar of Fire, The Throne of David and The Prince of the House of David. The first of these was supposed to illustrate the beginning of Hebraic power, the second its culmination and the last its decadence.

He was the grandson of silversmith Joseph Holt Ingraham.

== Works ==
- "The Southwest, by a Yankee" (1835)
- Lafitte: The Pirate of the Gulf (1836)
- Burton; or, The Sieges (1838)
- Captain Kyd or the wizard of the sea (1839)
- The Kelpie Rock (1839)
- The Quadroone; or, St. Michael's Day (1840)
- Mate Burke, or, The foundlings of the sea (1846)
- The Prince of the House of David (1855)
- The Sunny South, a collection of letters, published under the pen name Kate Conyngham.
- The Pillar of Fire (1859), used as one of the bases of the film The Ten Commandments
