= Casco Bay Bridge =

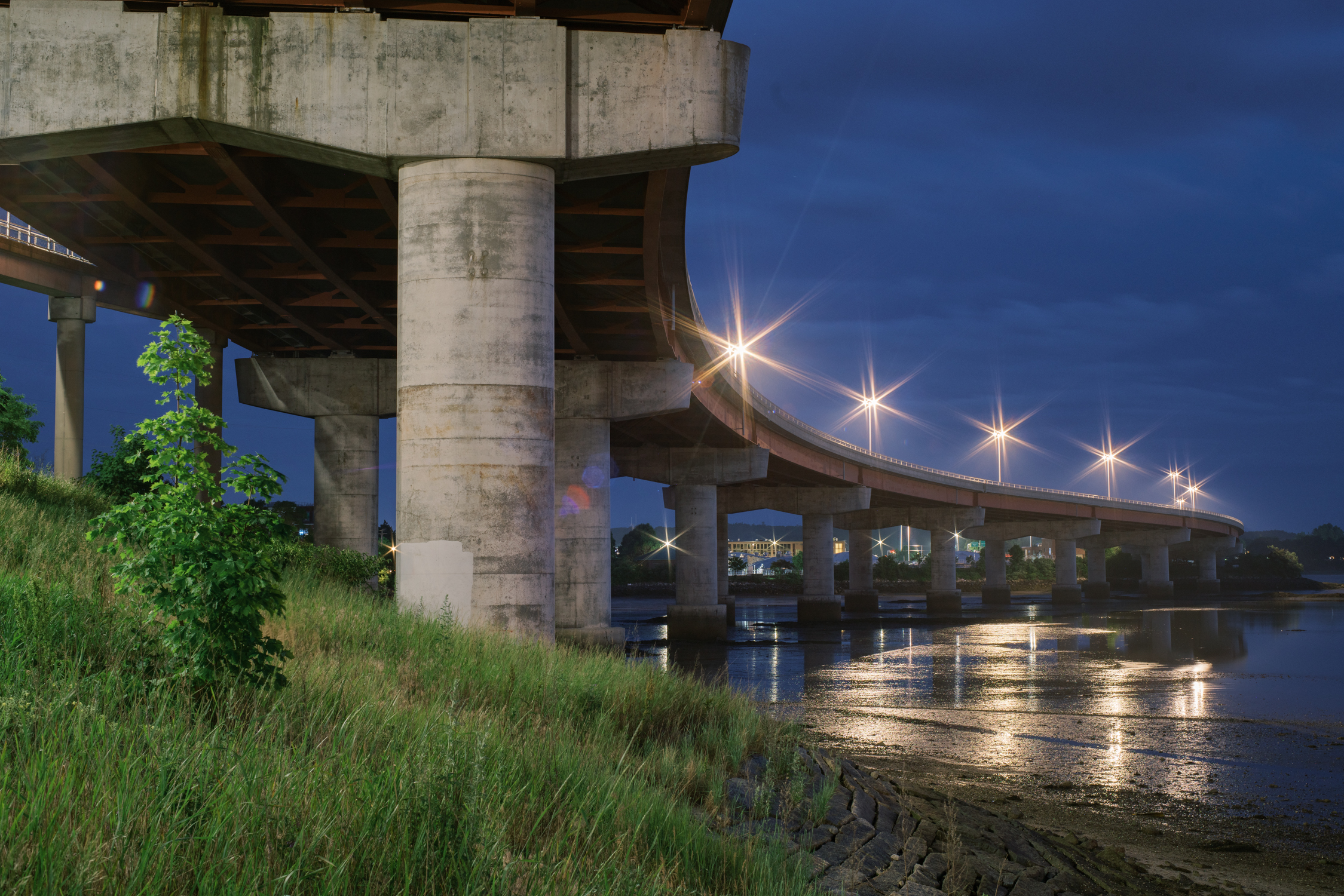
- Coordinates: 43.644647°N 70.25656°W
- Carries: Motor vehicles and pedestrians
- Crosses: Fore River
- Locale: Portland, Maine

Characteristics
- Design: Multi-Girder Bascule
- Total length: 4,748 feet (1,447 m)
- Longest span: 285 feet (87 m) at movable span
- Clearance below: 65 feet (20 m)

History
- Opened: August 1997

Statistics
- Daily traffic: 32,000+ vehicles per day

Location
- Interactive map of Casco Bay Bridge

The Casco Bay Bridge is a bascule bridge that spans the Fore River, connecting South Portland and Portland, Maine, United States. The bridge carries four lanes (two in each direction) of State Route 77, a bike lane in each direction, and a pedestrian sidewalk on the east side of the span.

== History ==
In 1987 the state of Maine, in concert with surrounding towns, concluded that the existing Million Dollar Bridge, which was almost 70 years old, was inadequate for current needs. This bridge, also a draw bridge, had only two traffic lanes and offered severely limited clearances for maritime traffic. Given increases in tanker commerce and increased usage of the bridge, a replacement was decided on, and construction started in 1993. The Casco Bay Bridge was completed in 1997.

In October 2015, the Maine Department of Transportation announced that it was seeking bids to privatize the maintenance and operation of the bridge, stating that it would be more cost effective and efficient for taxpayers. If done, it would be the first time the State privatized the operation of a bridge. The Maine State Employees Association questioned the public safety implications of a private entity operating the bridge, as wondered what would happen to the employees who presently operate it.

== Design ==
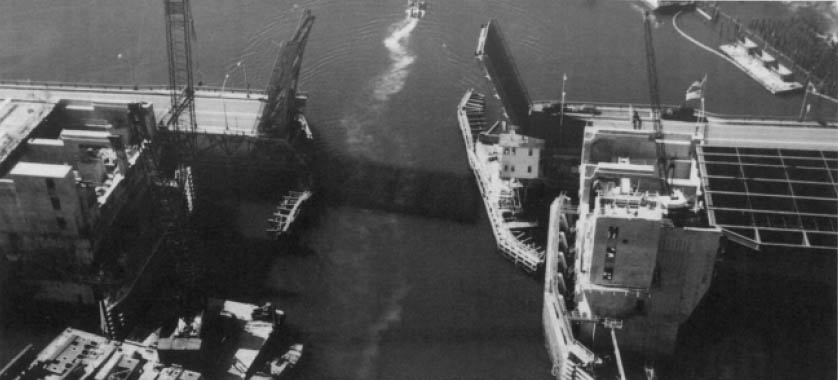
Casco Bay Bridge under construction. The span is much larger than its predecessor

The new Casco Bay Bridge has four 12-foot (3.7 m) wide lanes, with a pedestrian lane on its eastern side. The bridge is supported by several 7-foot (2.1 m) meter) thick concrete H-pile cylinders, which the bridge's steel girders sit atop. The new bridge has much higher horizontal and vertical clearances, which allow larger ships access further into the Fore River, with the bascule also having to open less frequently. Extra precautions were taken to ensure that the bridge had sufficient pier protection – during construction to the bridge, the existing Million Dollar Bridge was struck at its piers by the oil tanker Julie N, which spilled roughly 179,600 U.S. gallons (680,000 liters) of heating oil into Casco Bay. The bridge's steelwork was painted red in order to make it aesthetically pleasing.

The final cost for the Casco Bay Bridge was $130 million, making it the largest project undertaken by the Maine Department of Transportation at the time.
