= Fore River (Maine) =

Estuary in Maine, United States

Coordinates: 43°39′42.1″N 70°18′28.2″W

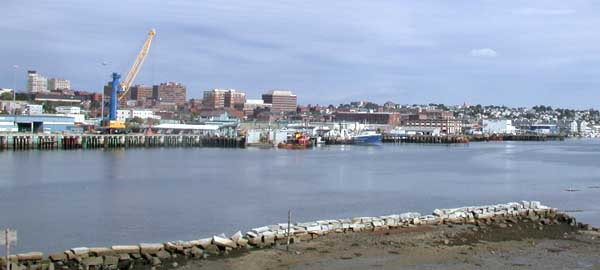
The Fore River, looking towards Portland from South Portland

The Fore River is a short horn-shaped estuary, approximately 5.7 miles (9.2 km) long, separating Portland and South Portland in Maine in the United States. Many of the port facilities of the Portland harbor are along the estuary, which is formed just southwest of Portland by the confluence of several creeks. The estuary was initially known as Levett's River, so named by the first English settler of the Casco Bay region, Capt. Christopher Levett. But shortly afterwards, the estuary came to have the name by which it is known today.

The Stroudwater River flows into the Fore River estuary. The Cumberland and Oxford Canal connected the estuary with Sebago Lake via the Stroudwater River from 1832 through 1870. The estuary enters Casco Bay on the southeast edge of Portland, a short distance after Long Creek flows into it. Like other coastal areas along the Gulf of Maine, it experiences moderately high tides, and thus the water level in the estuary and the harbor varies greatly throughout the day, leaving mud flats at low tide. It is spanned by the Pan Am Railways bridge and three highway bridges: the Casco Bay Bridge which connects Portland to South Portland, Veterans Memorial Bridge which carries Route 1, and a causeway which carries I-295.
