= Casco Bay =

Inlet of the Gulf of Maine, United States

- Bay
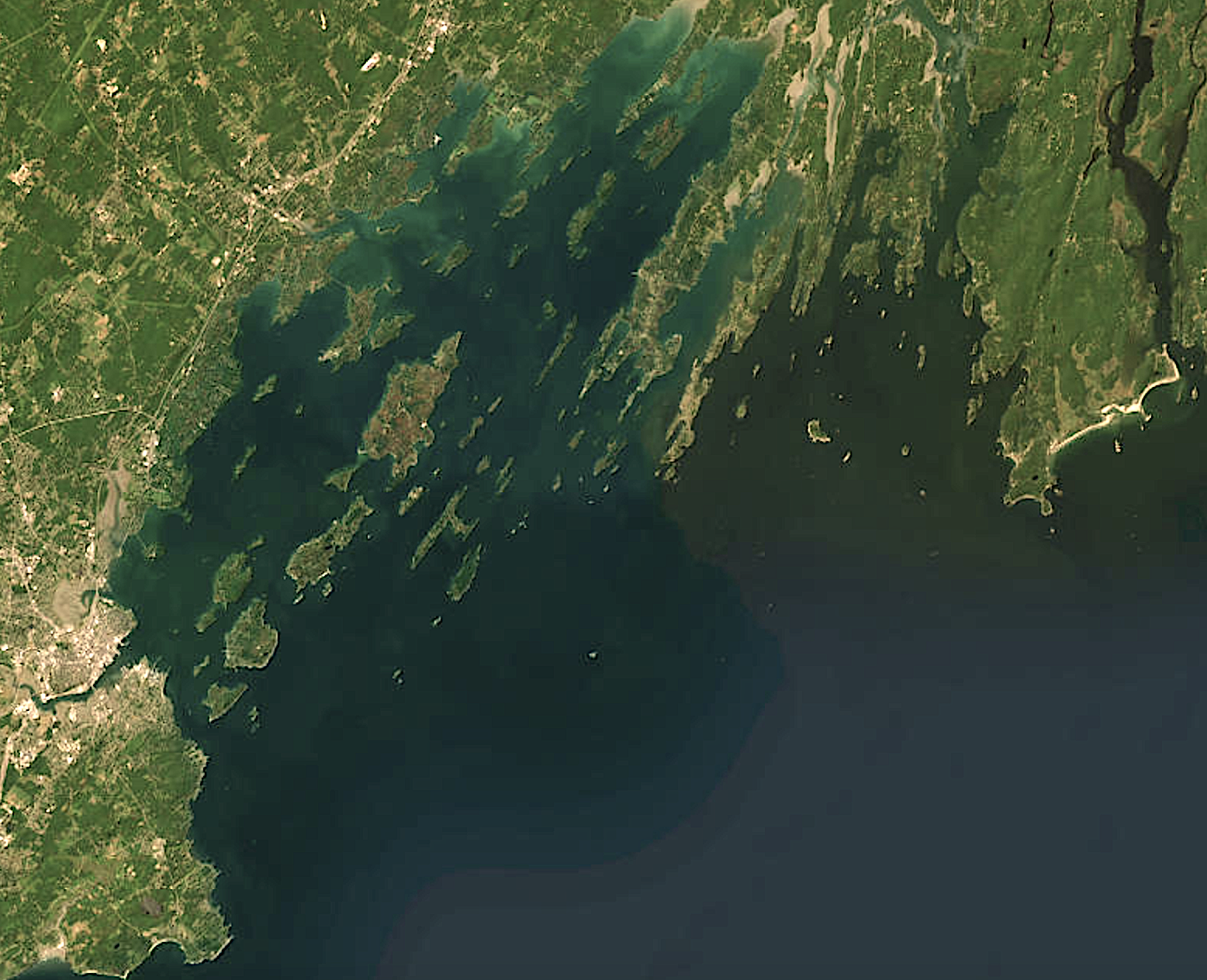
- A United States Geological Survey satellite image of Casco Bay
- Interactive map of Casco Bay
- Coordinates: 43°39′N 70°03′W
- Country: United States
- State: Maine
- Time zone: UTC-5 (Eastern (EST))
  - Summer (DST): UTC-4 (EDT)

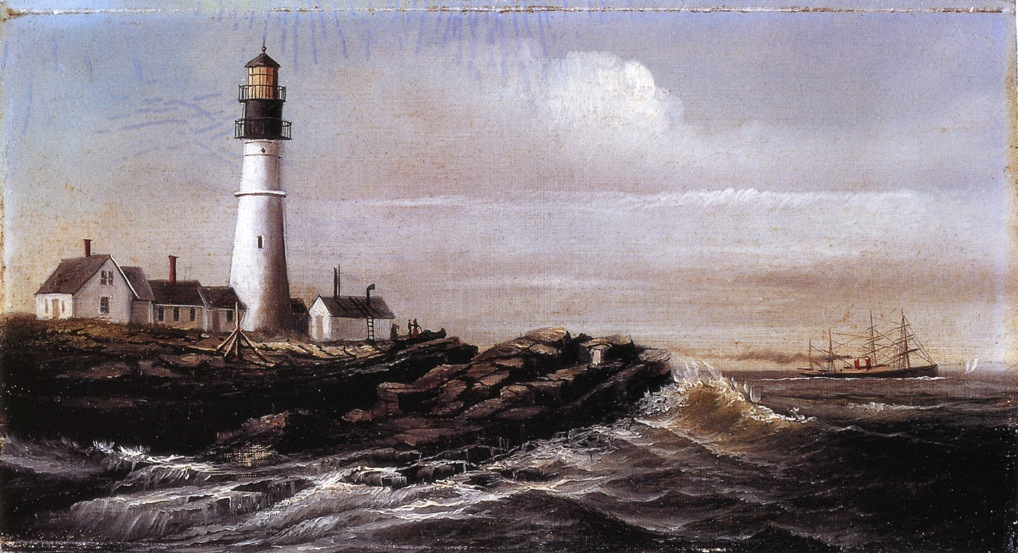
Portland Head Light, Maine, William Aiken Walker

Casco Bay is an open bay of the Gulf of Maine on the coast of Maine in the United States. The National Oceanic and Atmospheric Administration's chart for Casco Bay marks the dividing line between the bay and the Gulf of Maine as running from Bald Head on Cape Small in Phippsburg west-southwest to Dyer Point in Cape Elizabeth. The city of Portland and the Port of Portland are on Casco Bay's western edge.

== Name origin ==
There are multiple theories about the origin of the name "Casco Bay". Aucocisco, an Anglicisation of the Abenaki name for the bay, means "place of herons", "marshy place", or "place of slimy mud". The explorer Estêvão Gomes mapped Maine's coast in 1525 and named the bay "Bahía de Cascos", translated as "Bay of Helmets", based on its shape.

Colonel Wolfgang William Römer, an English military engineer, reported in 1700 that the bay had "as many islands as there are days in the year" leading to the bay's islands being called the Calendar Islands, based on the popular myth there are 365 of them. Estimates vary on the actual count, with the Casco Bay Estuary Partnership listing 785 if including exposed ledges. Former Maine state historian Robert M. York said there are "little more than two hundred" islands in Casco Bay.

== Geography and other characteristics ==
Casco Bay spans about 229 square miles, with its shore stretching 578 miles by one estimate and the inner bay divided into eastern and western sections by the Harpswell Neck peninsula.

In addition to Portland, Cape Elizabeth, and Phippsburg, municipalities with shorelines fronting Casco Bay include Brunswick, Cumberland, Falmouth, Freeport, Harpswell, South Portland, West Bath, Yarmouth, and the island towns of Chebeague Island and Long Island.

Researchers with the U.S. Geological Survey have dated volcanic material embedded in exposed bedrock in Casco Bay to the Ordovician period roughly 470 million years ago, predating the formation of the Atlantic Ocean by some 320 million years. The Norumbega fault developed just inland from the Maine coast, with the geologic fault running roughly parallel to the coastline, including a portion of the northern shore of Casco Bay. The Flying Point fault in Casco Bay is considered part of the Norumbega fault system, dividing bedrock formations that have distinct geological characteristics.

Around 14,000 BCE during the Wisconsin glaciation period at the end of the last glacial cycle, the Laurentide ice sheet covering the Casco Bay region began to recede, according to radiocarbon dating on marine shells and other materials. The glacier's retreat stripped bare underlying bedrock to form the rocky coast of Casco Bay's shore and islands.

According to NOAA's soundings, the bay's deepest point is about 204 feet, southwest of Halfway Rock. A Phippsburg hill called Fuller Mountain has the bay's highest elevation along the immediate shoreline, estimated at 269 feet above sea level by the U.S. Geological Survey in 1980, and 277 feet on more recent topographical maps. Sebascodegan Island has the highest elevation of any Casco Bay island at 201 feet on a hill called Long Reach Mountain, followed by Great Chebeague Island at 176 feet.

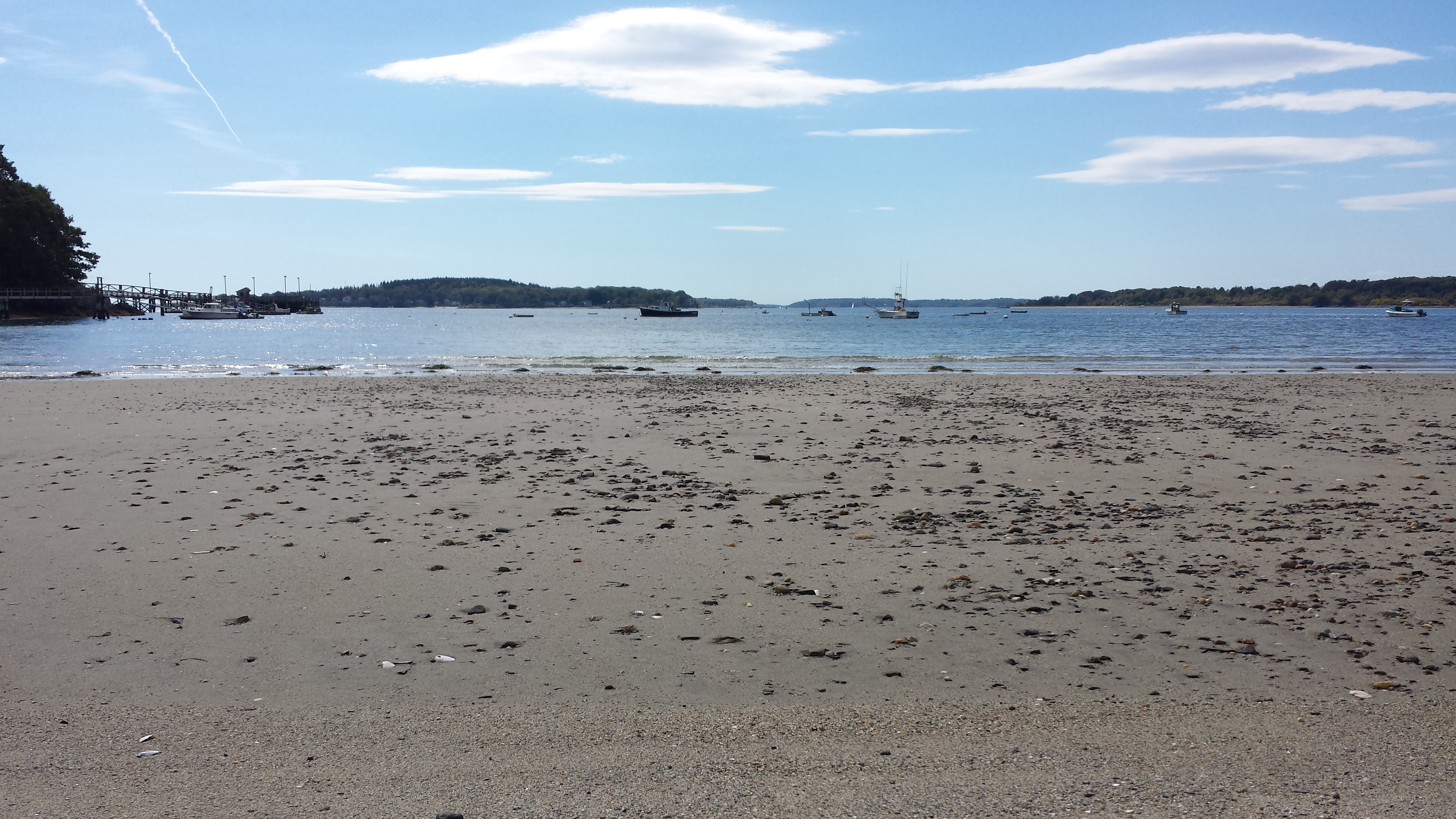
A Chebeague Island beach in October 2016, overlooking Chandler Cove formed by Great Chebeague and Little Chebeague islands in Casco Bay, Maine.

In Casco Bay's western reaches, a line of islands extends west from Great Chebeague to Cushing Island to create protected anchorages for vessels, as do the narrow peninsulas that jut into the bay's eastern section. A number of deep-water channels lead into the bay's inner sections, including Cushing Island Reach, Hussey Sound, Luckse Sound, Broad Sound, and Merriconeag Sound.

Casco Bay's shoreline creates a number of smaller bays and tidal embayments, including Harpswell Sound, Maquoit Bay, Middle Bay, Quahog Bay and New Meadows River, where depths exceed 150 feet in a narrow channel just south of Cundy's Harbor.

Casco Bay's topography produces a tidal range of about nine feet on average. Seawater circulates counterclockwise into Casco Bay via the Gulf of Maine Gyre, which is formed from cold water that passes over the Scotian Shelf off Nova Scotia, then in and out of the Bay of Fundy. In Casco Bay, tidal currents are stronger between island channels and weaker in smaller bays in the eastern section.

The Casco Bay watershed has been estimated at 986 square miles, with more than 1,300 streams in the basin. The Presumpscot River is the largest single source of non-saline water emptying directly into Casco Bay, flowing south from its headwaters at Sebago Lake, Maine's second-largest lake. The Royal River and the Stroudwater River are also considered main stem rivers emptying into Casco Bay. In addition to freshwater entering Casco Bay from those rivers and smaller watercourses along its length, lower-salinity seawater outside the mouth of the Kennebec River circulates west into Casco Bay.

== Ecology ==
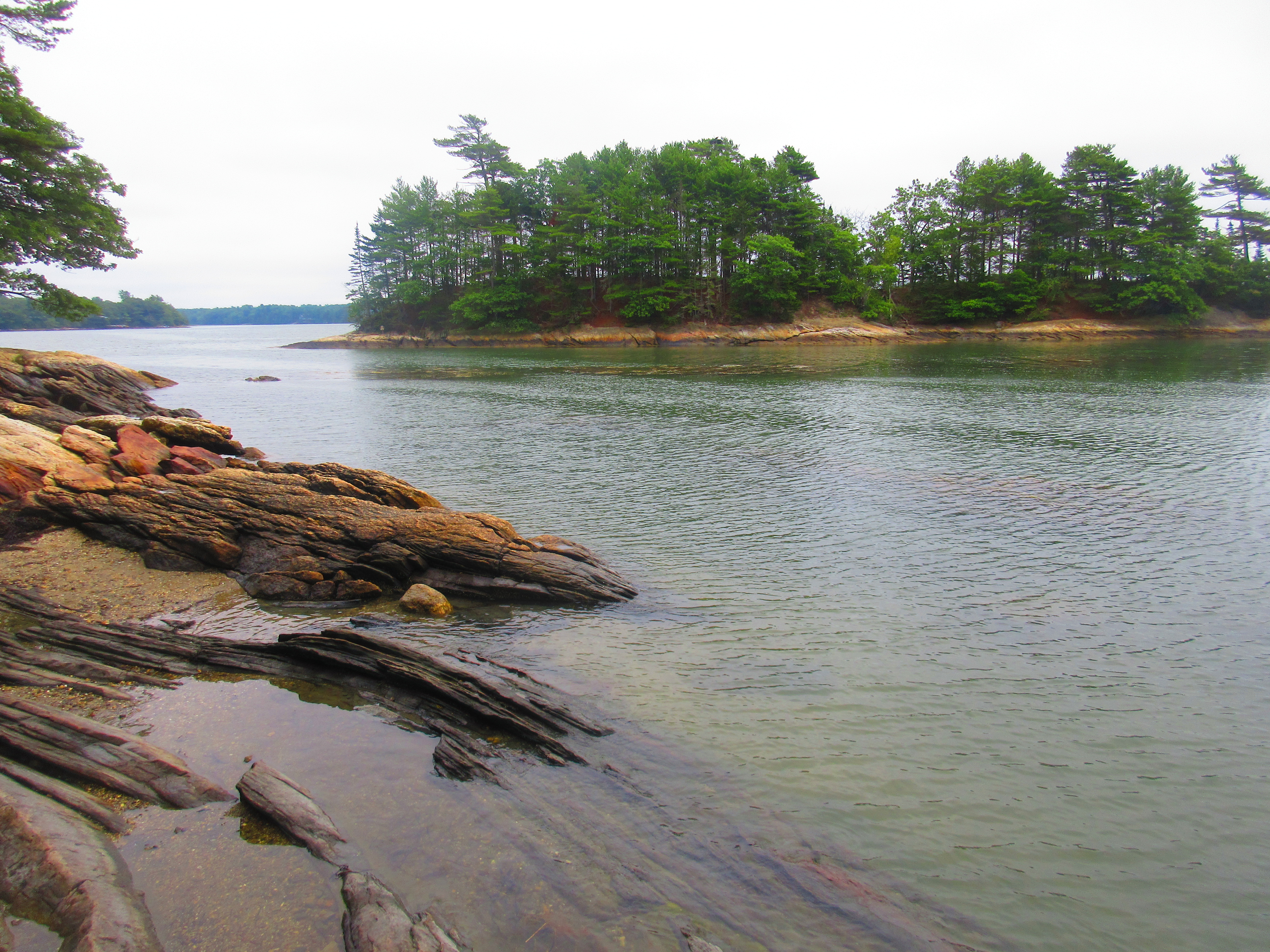
The shoreline of Freeport and Googins Island in Casco Bay.

Scientists have defined a distinct Casco Bay Coast Biophysical Region as part of the larger Northeastern Mixed Forest Province, with common tree species including red maple, eastern white pine, northern red oak and gray birch.

More than 800 marine species have been identified in Casco Bay.

Water temperatures in Casco Bay rose by 3 degrees Fahrenheit over a three-decade period through 2022, with some scientists linking the change to shifting mixes of organisms and wildlife in the bay.

In a 2019 study of invasive species threatening Casco Bay eelgrass and kelp beds that other organisms and wildlife depend on, researchers found abundant evidence of the presence of several types of tunicates, bryozoa, Japanese skeleton shrimp and European green crabs. As of 2022, Casco Bay's eelgrass beds were at 28% of their coverage area two decades earlier.

Casco Bay has an estimated 16,655 acres (6,740 ha) of intertidal habitats to include mudflats, marshes, beaches and rock formations according to the National Wetlands Inventory, supporting a range of biota and wildlife.

In a Gulf of Maine Research Institute analysis of predominant sea creatures caught in seine and jigging surveys in 2025, the most common species were alewife, American sand lance, Atlantic silverside, bluefish, green crabs, mummichog, grubby sculpin, permit and winter flounder. Catches of Atlantic herring, Atlantic silverside and green crabs hit the lowest on record.

Other species of fish found in Casco Bay include Atlantic mackerel, bluefin tuna, Atlantic pollock, Atlantic tomcod, cod, cunner, menhaden, northern pipefish, sharks, smelt, and striped bass. Shellfish include lobsters, Asian shore crabs, mussels, clams, oysters, scallops and periwinkles.

Harbor seal populations have been observed to number between 400 and 500 seals in Casco Bay. There have been a number of whale sightings in Casco Bay over the years, including the beluga whale, the North Atlantic right whale and the humpback whale.

The number of water birds in Casco Bay varies by season and migratory cycles, with studies having shown anywhere from less than 5,000 to 32,000 or more across as many as 150 species. Surveys of seabird populations in 1979 and 1980 identified nearly 5,400 nesting pairs of herring gulls across 56 colonies; close to 4,000 pairs of double-crested cormorants in 15 colonies; almost 3,000 pairs of eider ducks in 45 colonies; more than 2,100 pairs of great black-backed gulls in 37 colonies; and about 560 nesting pairs of common terns in nine colonies. Smaller numbers of horned grebes, common loons, ring-billed gulls, Bonaparte's gulls and laughing gulls have been observed.

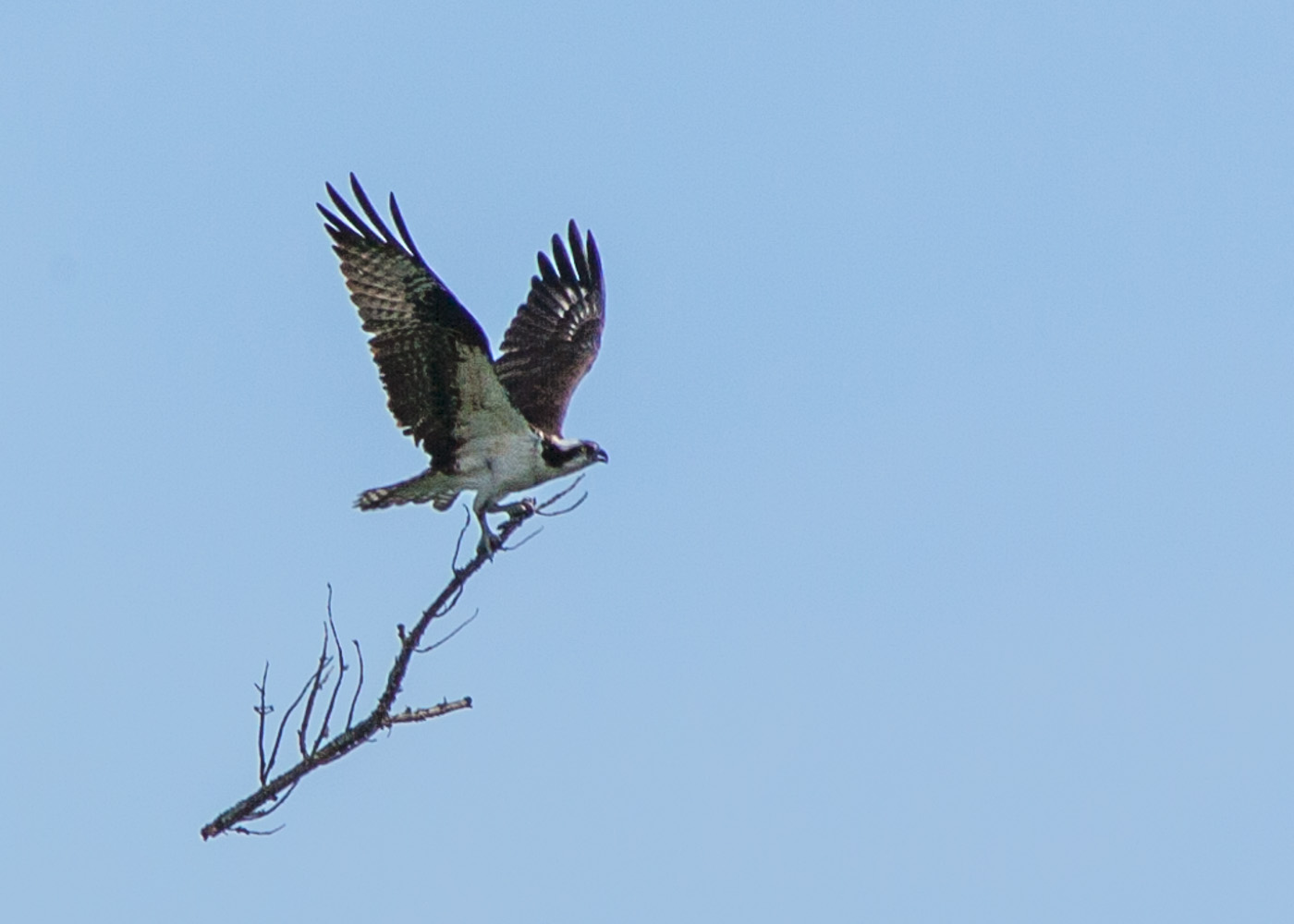
An osprey in flight in 2014 over Casco Bay off Freeport, Maine. Photograph by Paul VanDerWerf

As of 1996, scientists had identified 50 islands in Casco Bay that were used as nesting grounds for 15% of Maine's nesting seabirds, with 17 of those islands deemed to have nationally significant populations. That included nesting areas for great blue herons, black-crowned night herons, glossy ibises and snowy egrets.

In addition to eider, other waterfowl in Casco Bay depending on seasons include Canada geese, snow geese, black ducks, goldeneyes, buffleheads, greater scaup, scoters, long-tailed ducks and harlequin ducks. Migratory shorebirds that pass through Casco Bay include sandpipers, plovers, turnstones, dowitchers and greater yellowlegs. As of 2024, the Maine Department of Inland Fisheries & Wildlife had designated four locations in Casco Bay as "essential habitats" for colonies of the threatened or endangered species of piping plover, least tern and roseate tern, at Clapboard Island, The Nubbin, Jenny Island and Pond Island.

Raptor populations on Casco Bay islands and shorelines include osprey, with 86 nesting pairs observed in a 2011 survey, and 14 more nests that were deemed potentially active. After 30 years of monitoring produced no evidence of bald eagles in Casco Bay, a nesting pair was spotted in Freeport in 1992, followed by bald eagle pairs in Brunswick and Harpswell in 1994 and 1995. As of 2018, fifteen bald eagle pairs were observed in Casco Bay communities, nine of them in Harpswell.

A 1992 study determined found that while contaminants like polycyclic aromatic hydrocarbons, polychlorinated biphenyls and trace metals were detectable throughout Casco Bay, they were "generally far below levels suspected of evoking a toxic biological response."

== History ==
=== Native American population and arrival of European settlers ===
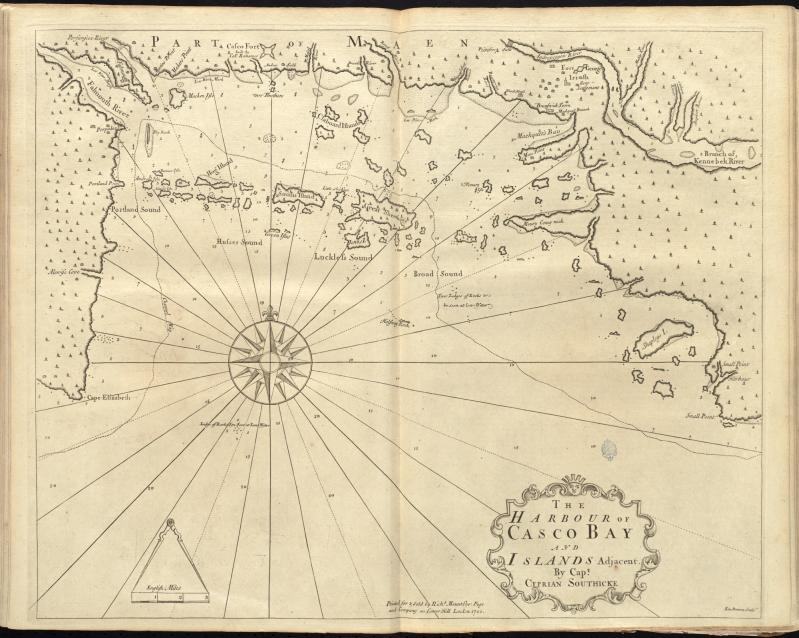
Cyprian Southack's chart of Casco Bay, Maine, published in 1720.

At the time of European contact in the 16th century, an Abenaki people called the Almouchiquois inhabited the region of present-day Casco Bay, including a group called the Aucocisco in the vicinity of the Presumpscot River in Casco Bay's western section; and the Pejepscot who lived along the bay's eastern section and in the Androscoggin River valley to the north.

Some Casco Bay islands have archaeological evidence of Native American visits and camps extending back 4,000 years, including shell middens and harpoon points.

It is uncertain whether early European explorers Giovanni da Verrazzano, John Cabot, Estêvão Gomes, or Bartholomew Gosnold entered Casco Bay. It is believed that Martin Pring made landfall in Casco Bay as part of a 1603 expedition, with Samuel de Champlain and Pierre Dugua de Mons exploring it in 1605 from a base in Nova Scotia. In establishing the Popham Colony settlement near the mouth of the Kennebec River, George Popham landed in Casco Bay in 1607 while exploring the wider region. After Henry Hudson's ship Half Moon was damaged in 1609 while attempting to discover a northwest passage to India, Hudson landed in Casco Bay for repairs.

In 1616, John Smith published a map of New England that included a depiction of Casco Bay based on his exploration of the region two years earlier.

Contact with Europeans exposed Wabanaki peoples to new diseases, with epidemics striking starting in 1616 that produced high mortality rates. By one estimate, just 25% of the Wabanaki survived epidemics that broke out through 1619.

On August 10, 1622, King James I of England awarded a land patent to Ferdinando Gorges and John Mason for coastal lands and interiors extending from the Merrimack River to the Kennebec. Gorges and Mason eventually split the patent, with Gorges getting land patent rights north of the Piscataqua River.

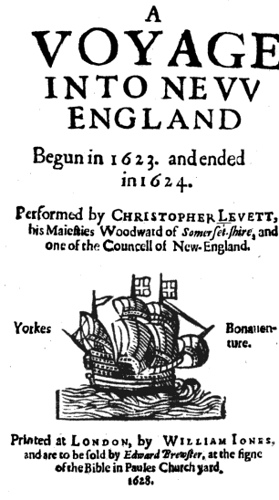
The frontispiece of "A Voyage into New England" penned by Casco Bay pioneer Christopher Levett.

The first colonial settlement in Casco Bay was created by Christopher Levett, an English merchant and explorer. Through the Council for New England, King James I awarded Levett 6,000 acres in Maine for a settlement and ordered churches to take up collections to support the voyage. Levett set sail in 1623, and arriving at the mouth of the Piscataqua River, set out in two small boats to explore candidate sites to the north for a settlement. Arriving in Casco Bay where he received a friendly reception from Abenaki leaders, Levett pushed as far as the Kennebec River region before returning to Casco Bay as his first choice. Levett ordered the construction of a stone house on what would become known as House Island, with Levett calling the settlement Machigonne derived from an Algonquian word transalated as "great neck." Levett left behind a small group of settlers and returned to England, publishing a book chronicling the voyage and settlement he had intended to be named York. The fate is unknown of the settlers.

At the time, the sachem of the Almouchiquois along the Presumpscot was Scitterygusset, also known as Skitterygusset and other alternate spellings in historic records. Scitterygusset's sister Warrabitta also had a leadership role.

In 1626, John Cousins established a homestead in Machigonne, which would become known as Casco. In 1635, he moved several miles east to a waterway that became known as the Cousins River. Cousins Island and Littlejohn Island are also named for him.

Walter Bagnall settled in 1628 on Richmond Island, south of Cape Elizabeth and Casco Bay, and initiated trade with the Wabanaki. Bagnall was deemed an unscrupulous trader, and in 1631 Scitterygusset led a small band to the island to kill him and torch the island homestead.

The Council for New England recognized what became known as the Province of Lygonia under Gorges' patent, which included the Casco Bay region. The New England Council issued land grants "in a very loose manner" according to one historic account, leading to conflicting claims among settlers arriving next in the Casco Bay area after Levett.

In 1630, a group reached the Casco Bay area on the ship Plough with a Council for New England patent to build a settlement, but finding the farmland and climate unsatisfactory, sailed south to the Massachusetts Bay Colony.

That year on the belief they held a valid patent, partners George Cleeve and Richard Tucker established a settlement along the Spurwink River and farmland on Richmond Island. After Plymouth merchants Robert Trelawney and Moses Goodyear were awarded a patent the following year for land between the Spurwink and Presumpscot rivers along with Richmond Island, they sent their agent John Winter to establish possession. Upon arriving in the spring of 1632, Winter served Cleeve and Tucker notice of his intent to evict them from their initial settlement and farmland, allowing them to harvest that year's crops before vacating the properties. Cleeve and Tucker chose land on Casco Neck and planted crops there in the spring of 1633, and within four years had obtained 1,500 acres of land there and established a fur-trading business.

In 1632, Gorges awarded Arthur Mackworth the island that became known as Mackworth Island, just off the mouth of the Presumpscot River, in what came to be called Casco, renamed Falmouth in 1658 under the governance of the Massachusetts Bay Colony. Historic Falmouth was split into two municipalities in 1786, creating Portland.

In 1632, Thomas Purchase and George Way received a grant for Harpswell Neck, a few years after Purchase had established a farm, trading post, and fish salting operation on the Androscoggin River north of Casco Bay.

William Royall and his wife, Phoebe, moved in 1636 from Salem, Massachusetts, to present-day Yarmouth, building a homestead and farm along what came to be known as the Royal River. That year, George Jewell purchased the Casco Bay island that became known as Jewell Island.

Cleeve leased the island known today as Peaks Island in 1637 to his son-in-law Michael Mitton, who lived there 60 years.

In 1640, John Sears moved from Boston to live on Long Island. Little is known about Sears.

In 1642, Cleeve, Tucker, Mackworth, Royall and Smith were among 30 signers of a petition to the British House of Commons asking for relief from administrators assigned by Gorges to the region who were exercising "unlawful and arbitrary power and jurisdiction over the persons and estate of your petitioners and the said other planters to their great oppression utter impoverishment and the hindrance of the plantation in these parts".

As settlers built out farms in the Casco Bay region, more commercial fishermen who were familiar with Casco Bay began making it their home port in the second half of the 1630s. Artisan craftsmen also moved to Casco and other towns on Casco Bay in the following decade, as a growing population supported commerce along with existing trade opportunities with indigenous peoples in the region.

Scitterygusset deeded Francis Small land in 1657, on Capisic Brook which drains into the Fore River. Two years later, Small purchased Sebascodegan Island on behalf of Nicholas Shapleigh of Kittery, and built a house there.

In 1659, George Munjoy moved to Casco and built a fortified house on today's Munjoy Hill, which overlooks Casco Bay. In 1666, Munjoy acquired additional land along the Presumpscot River via a deed co-signed by Warrabitta.

Islands continued to come under individual settler ownership during the 17th and 18th centuries. In 1658, Hugh Moshier purchased what became Moshier and Little Moshier Islands near the mouths of the Harraseeket and Royal Rivers, while James Lane acquired nearby Lanes Island. By 1660, John Bustion had obtained a deed on today's Bustins Island. Will Black Jr. relocated his family from Berwick in 1718 to the island that would become known as Will's Island, and later Bailey Island after its acquisition by Timothy Bailey of Massachusetts.

=== King Philip's War ===
Spurred by the Wampanoag chief Metacomet in what came to be known as King Philip's War, Native American warriors attacked colonial farms and settlements along the New England coast and inland areas beginning in June 1675, including in the Casco Bay region. If prodded into action by Metacomet's militant contemporaries drumming up support in northern New England, many local tribes followed their own counsel in planning attacks in the regional conflict that some historians dub the First Abenaki War, or chose not to initiate hostilities.

An artist's depiction of a Wabanaki attack included in the Thomas Hutchinson book King Philip's War, and Witchcraft in New England.

The first attack in the Casco Bay area occurred on September 10, 1675, at a farm north of Falmouth. Native American warriors killed six people and three more went missing. After another attack at Falmouth in October, heavy snow discouraged further action by either side for the rest of the year.

Despite concurrent peace talks by tribes to the east, in August 1676 Wabanaki Confederacy warriors raided several farms in Falmouth, killing or capturing 34 people. Settler Thaddeus Clark reported that survivors fled to Cushing Island, known at the time as Andrews Island for settler James Andrews. On Peaks Island that year, seven were killed in a Wabanaki attack after coming over from Cushing Island in search of food.

After colonial militia leader Richard Waldron laid a trap under the guise of peace talks to capture several Wabanaki warriors who were then executed or enslaved, tribes intensified attacks on settlements throughout Maine, causing most settlers to flee south. After talks failed at Maquoit Bay in February 1677, Waldron again ambushed Native Americans under the guise of parley.

In 1677, Gorges's grandson sold his land rights in Maine to the Massachusetts Bay Colony.

As Wabanaki peoples got word of colonial authorities reaching out to leaders of the Mohawk people for assistance in Maine, they became more amenable to a truce, though significant attacks continued on Maine coastal settlements west of Casco Bay. Leaders of the Penobscot people signed the Treaty of Casco at Fort Loyal, in present-day Portland, on April 12, 1678, binding the Wabanaki Confederacy to ending King Philip's War.

=== French and Indian Wars ===
==== King William's War ====
After the Treaty of Casco, settlers began returning to Maine, in some instances setting up farms and homesteads near protective stockades as a fallback option in case of any renewed tensions. In 1700, a stockade that also served as a trading post was built in Falmouth east of the Presumpscot River and called New Casco, with two cairns built to commemorate friendship between the Abenaki people and settlers. The Brothers islands just off present-day Falmouth are thought to have been named for the cairns.

The 1678 treaty did little to address simmering disagreements and discord throughout the region between local tribes and settlers, laying the foundation for a renewal of hostilities in 1688. Historians came to consider the new conflict in Maine part of the larger King William's War, which in turn marked the first installment of an extended proxy war between England and France that came to be known as the French and Indian Wars, with sporadic raids and atrocities on both sides.

In August 1688, in response to an English colonial raid of Penobscot Bay settlements, French officer Jean-Vincent d'Abbadie de Saint-Castin led counter-raids by Acadian militia and Wabanaki Confederacy warriors, including at Yarmouth. In September 1689, English colonial officer Benjamin Church arrived in Falmouth to defend settlers there, fending off a Wabanaki attack.

Louis de Buade de Frontenac, the Governor General of New France, launched a campaign to drive the English from the settlements east of Falmouth. On May 16, 1690, the fortified settlement on Casco Bay was attacked by a war party of 50 French-Canadian soldiers led by Castin, about 50 Abenaki warriors from Canada, a contingent of French militia led by Joseph-François Hertel de la Fresnière, and 300 to 400 additional natives from Maine, including some Penobscots under the leadership of Madockawando. Fort Loyal was attacked at the same time. About 75 men in the Casco settlement fought for four days before surrendering on May 20 on condition of safe passage. Instead, most of the men, including John Swarton, were killed, and the survivors, including Hannah Swarton and her children, were captured. Swarton was ransomed in 1695. Cotton Mather published her story.

Church returned to Casco Bay in September 1690 with a contingent of about 300 volunteer militia and indigenous warriors, launching attacks up the Androscoggin River and overseeing the brutal killings of Native Americans who had been left behind in a village, then pulling back to Cape Elizabeth. There, Church's force beat off a Wabanaki attack in what was the last significant clash of King William's War on Casco Bay.

A ferry service was established by 1690 in Portland Harbor connecting the northern and southern banks of the Fore River.

==== Queen Anne's War and Dummer's War ====
An uneasy armistice did not hold in North America or Europe, with Queen Anne's War, which many historians classify as the second phase of the French and Indian Wars, breaking out in 1701. In 1722 came the regional conflict in Maine and Acadia called Dummer's War, named for William Dummer, lieutenant governor of the province of Massachusetts Bay.

In Falmouth on June 20, 1703, Massachusetts Governor Joseph Dudley sought assurances from local Wabanaki chiefs that they would not initiate hostilities against English colonial settlers. The pact came to be known as the Treaty of Casco of 1703, which recognized the Kennebec River as the dividing line between New England and Acadia and New France to the east.

Fort George, on the Androscoggin River west of the Kennebec and about five miles north of Middle Bay, saw multiple fights during Queen Anne's War. There was little fighting on Casco Bay, with one man killed in a Native American raid in May 1724 at Cape Elizabeth.

After initial treaties in 1725 and 1726, a larger ratification conference was held in August 1727 that came to be called the Treaty of Casco Bay, binding the two sides to terms for peace.

The town of Brunswick was incorporated in 1739.

==== King George's War ====
Relations remained strained, with the Presumpscot River sachem Polin traveling to Boston in 1739 to lodge a protest with the governor of Massachusetts Bay Colony over the damming of the river by settlers, which was threatening the fish supplies on which the Wabanaki peoples depended.

In the run-up to the outbreak of King George's War in 1744, French privateers were operating from Cape Breton Island in Nova Scotia against New England fishing boats.

Under the leadership of Kittery shipping owner William Pepperrell, Massachusetts and other English colonies mustered a military expedition against the Fortress of Louisbourg on Cape Breton. Pepperrell's fleet commodore was Falmouth native Edward Tyng, who directed the siege and supporting operations from his flagship frigate Massachusetts.

=== Pre-Revolution ===
In 1751, the British Royal Navy assigned George Tate to Maine to oversee the harvesting of timber for ship masts, having previously focused its mast timber operations along the Piscataqua River basin. Tate built a house on a tributary of the Fore River estuary that today is the Tate House Museum. At the head of the Harraseeket River in Freeport, Mast Landing was likewise a loading point for pine timber reserved as masts for the Royal Navy. Mast timber was a sufficiently valuable commodity for the Royal Navy to provide timber cargo ships with armed escorts, and to send them back across the North Atlantic with empty holds to shorten the times for fresh shipments to arrive at British shipyards. Maine pines were marked with the "broad arrow" symbol to indicate that they were for harvest in service of the navy. Anyone else caught felling those trees was fined.

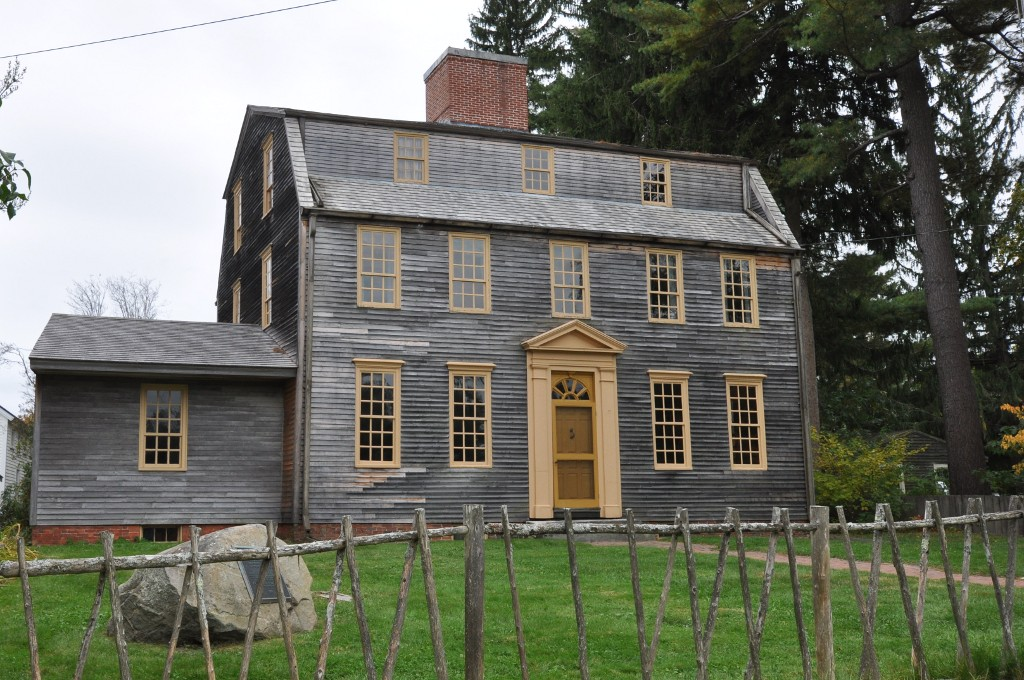
The historic Tate House Museum in Portland, Maine, with the original structure built in about 1755 by the royal mast agent George Tate.

Tate also pursued other mercantile interests, selling lumber, clapboards, rum, and other products, helping build the port as a growing center of commerce alongside merchants like Samuel Waldo, Jedidiah Preble, William Tyng, Enoch Freeman, Enoch Moody, and Thomas Westbrook, who began harvesting mast timber in 1727 and in partnership with Waldo dammed the Presumpscot River in 1735 for a sawmill and gristmill. In 1768, Falmouth exported more than four million feet of lumber and 150,000 wood staves for barrels to British ports, and between 1768 and 1772 shipped more mast timber than the largest ports in Nova Scotia, New Hampshire, Massachusetts, New York, and Pennsylvania combined. West Indies ports were also major export destinations for wood products loaded at Falmouth, for use in construction and barrels. Imported products were sold in Falmouth stores and distributed throughout the Casco Bay region and inland.

The booming wood trade helped create cottage industries, with exports bringing in money to fund extensive construction, including churches, inns, assembly halls, and infrastructure, like bridges.

Harpswell was incorporated in 1758, followed by Cape Elizabeth in 1765.

Falmouth and other coastal towns were still outposts in an otherwise remote region, as John Adams wrote in an account of a 1765 trip through Maine, part of his legal circuit at the time as an attorney. Adams wrote, "From Falmouth now Portland in Casco Bay, to Pownalborough there was an entire wilderness, except North Yarmouth, New Brunswick and Long Reach. At each of which places were a few Houses. In general it was a wilderness, encumbered with the greatest number of trees, of the largest size, the tallest height, I have ever seen."

=== American Revolution ===
According to Adams, he was strolling in 1774 on what he called "the great hill" of Munjoy Hill in Falmouth overlooking Casco Bay when he relayed to Jonathan Sewall his determination to lead the colonies into revolt against the British crown. "The die was now cast; I had passed the Rubicon", Adams recollected conveying to Sewall. "Swim or sink, live or die, survive or perish with my country, was my unalterable determination."

Meeting in September and October 1774 in Philadelphia, the First Continental Congress issued a declaration of rights that included the formation of a Continental Association to coordinate a boycott of British goods starting in December.

On March 2, 1775, the Brunswick Continental Association leader Samuel Thompson invoked the boycott in attempting to block a ship from unloading rigging and other maritime supplies, with HMS Canceaux dispatched from Boston to Falmouth to provide protection. In the Thompson's War standoff that played out for weeks and overlapped with the Battles of Lexington and Concord, militia captured Henry Mowat, commander of HMS Canceaux, with another officer on the ship threatening to shell Falmouth unless Mowat was released. HMS Canceaux sailed out of port in May 1775.

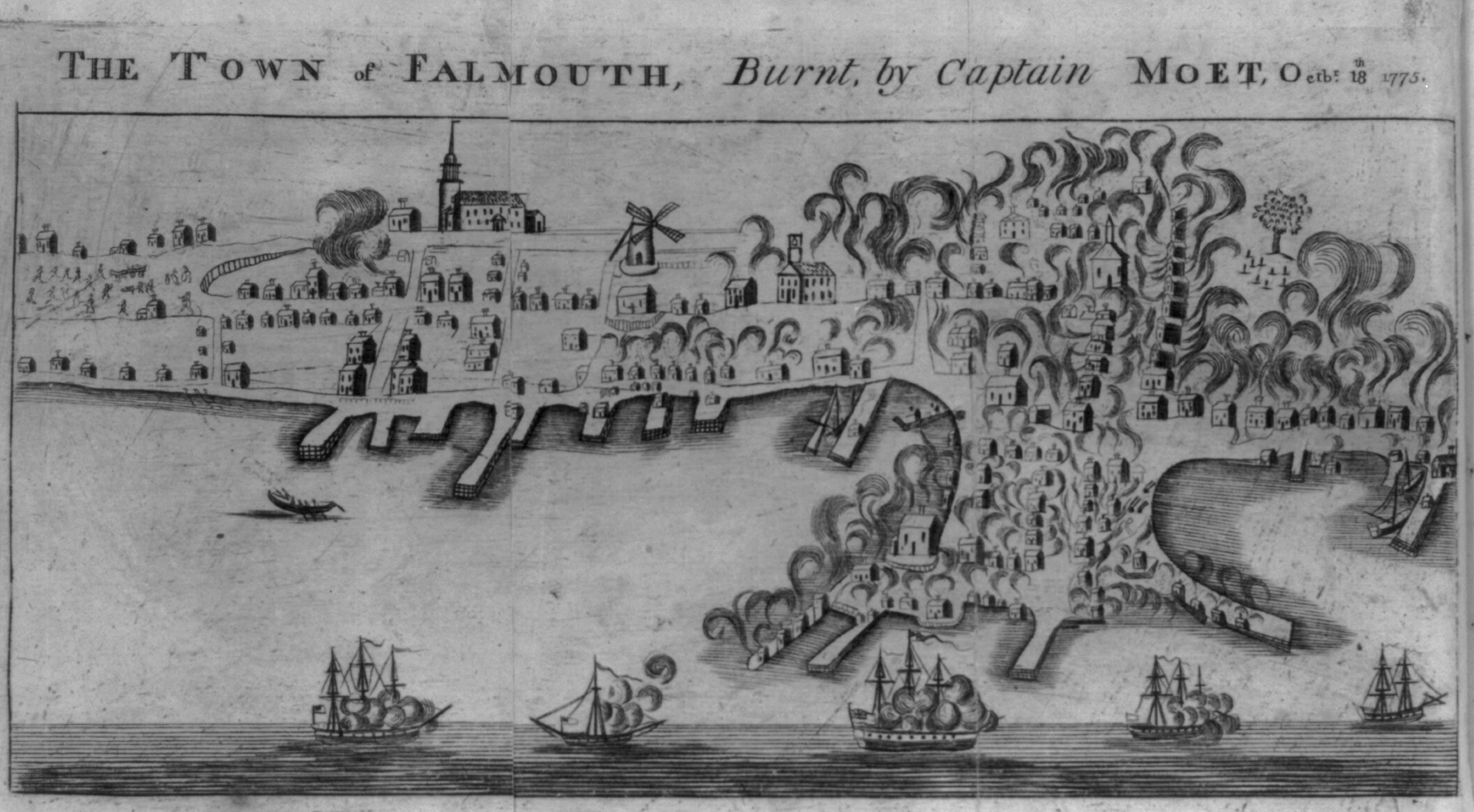
An artist's depiction of the 1775 burning of Falmouth by British warships and landing parties.

Mowat returned in October with a small squadron of ships and orders to bombard coastal Maine population centers, including Falmouth. After delivering an ultimatum for Falmouth denizens to surrender all arms and swear allegiance to King George III, Mowat allowed time for residents to flee parts of the town within cannon range before opening fire. Some 400 structures and several vessels were destroyed in the bombardment or by landing parties setting buildings to flame, leaving about 1,000 people homeless. The Burning of Falmouth stiffened the resolve of those in favor of revolt, and galvanized the Second Continental Congress to underwrite the creation of the Continental Navy.

The Royal Navy frigate HMS Cerberus arrived at Falmouth in early November, but left after residents continued construction of shore fortifications on Munjoy Hill. Massachusetts assigned General Joseph Frye to oversee fort construction, which extended in 1776 beyond Falmouth Neck to Spring Point on Cape Elizabeth, the future site of Fort Preble.

Falmouth was garrisoned for most of the remainder of the war as a precaution against any further British raids.

Casco Bay was home to several privateer ships and captains during the war, including the sloop Retrieve, commanded by Falmouth native Joshua Stone, which was captured in September 1776 by HMS Milford a month after receiving a privateer commission. Freed in a prisoner exchange, Stone went on to command the privateers Rattlesnake and Fox, with the latter vessel under the command of Falmouth's Nathaniel Pote at another point. Other Falmouth residents or natives who commanded privateers included James Dilworth on Blackfish, Philip Crandall on Roebuck, and Henry Butler Elwell and Reuben Gage on Union. Harpswell residents Nathaniel Purinton and Isaac Snow had stints as commander of the 14-ton schooner America.

In April 1778, the French frigate La Sensible arrived in Casco Bay with a communique of France's commitment to what would become known as the Treaty of Alliance that would result in extensive military and logistics support for the Continental Army, including naval power to hamper British movements.

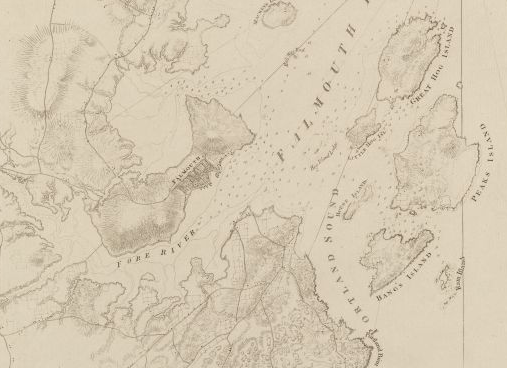
Joseph F.W. DesBarres 1777 depiction of Falmouth's harbor, as part of his chart of Casco Bay.

In 1777, five years after surveyor Samuel Holland produced a detailed chart of the Maine coast from Casco Bay to the Kennebec River, cartographer Joseph Frederick Wallet DesBarres (spelled Des Barres in some historic references), at the request of the British Admiralty, published Atlantic Neptune, a chart book of the Atlantic coast from Newfoundland to New York. Rudimentary maps existed previously, including one produced by Cyprian Southack in 1720 that included information on tidal currents, based on a voyage to Casco Bay in 1698. The Holland charts detail Casco Bay's islands, channels, shallows, and rivers, many of them carrying historic names no longer in use. The chart labeled as Portland Point the southwesternmost point of Casco Bay, and used Portland Sound to describe the westernmost channel leading to the inner harbor. A chart of Falmouth Harbor DesBarres published in 1781 lists Holland as chief surveyor and has greater detail, including mapped details of the shoreline, including hills, roadways, and the locations of structures on the mainland and islands.

On September 3, 1783, the same day the Treaty of Paris was signed, ending the American Revolutionary War, a "Committee of the Sufferers in Falmouth, Casco Bay" wrote Benjamin Franklin to ask him to use his diplomatic connections to raise funds to assist in the reconstruction of Falmouth.

"It comes from Men who have suffered exceedingly, not only by the common Calamities of War, but by an extraordinary Event peculiarly awful and distressing", wrote five committee signatories in reference to the Burning of Falmouth.

=== Federalist era ===
In 1786, Falmouth was separated into two municipalities, with the historic name kept for the municipality formed east of the mouth of the Presumpscot River called New Casco, and Portland adopted as the new name for Falmouth Neck and inland. In 1789, Freeport was created from land that had previously been part of North Yarmouth.

In 1787 George Washington approved the construction of a lighthouse near the tip of Cape Elizabeth, which with a Congressional outlay was completed in 1791 and named Portland Head Light.

In July 1789, in its first two major legislative acts, Congress enacted the Tariff Act and Duties on Tonnage Act to establish a revenue stream and provide preferential tariffs for imports carried on U.S.-flagged ships, while mandating that coastal trade be limited to U.S. vessels. Intended to bolster the development of U.S. shipyards and a domestic merchant marine, the Duties on Tonnage Act did so: registered U.S. ship tonnage rose from 123,893 tons of vessels in 1789 to 848,307 tons in 1807.

A third law enacted at the end of the month established customs stations for the collection of duties, including one in Portland covering overseas trade there and in Falmouth, and approving North Yarmouth and Brunswick "as ports of delivery only" after ships paid duties on cargoes in Portland or Falmouth.

Historic records show at least four schooners were built at Falmouth between 1790 and 1800 and three schooners, four sloops, and a brig on the Royal River in Yarmouth. Shipbuilding accelerated in Casco Bay in the 19th century with the establishment of several major shipyards.

In 1796, Tukey's Bridge opened as a toll bridge, connecting the opposite points at the head of Portland's Back Cove.

The U.S. Census Bureau ranked Portland the 27th-largest municipality in the United States as of 1800, with a population of 3,704.

=== Jeffersonian era ===
==== Jefferson administration ====
In 1802, President Thomas Jefferson asked to meet with retired naval captain Edward Preble of Portland, and the next year Preble was made commodore of the Mediterranean Squadron assigned to neutralize privateers operating out of Tripoli. He made the USS Constitution his flagship and oversaw a blockade and multiple assaults on Tripoli to contain the Barbary pirates threat.

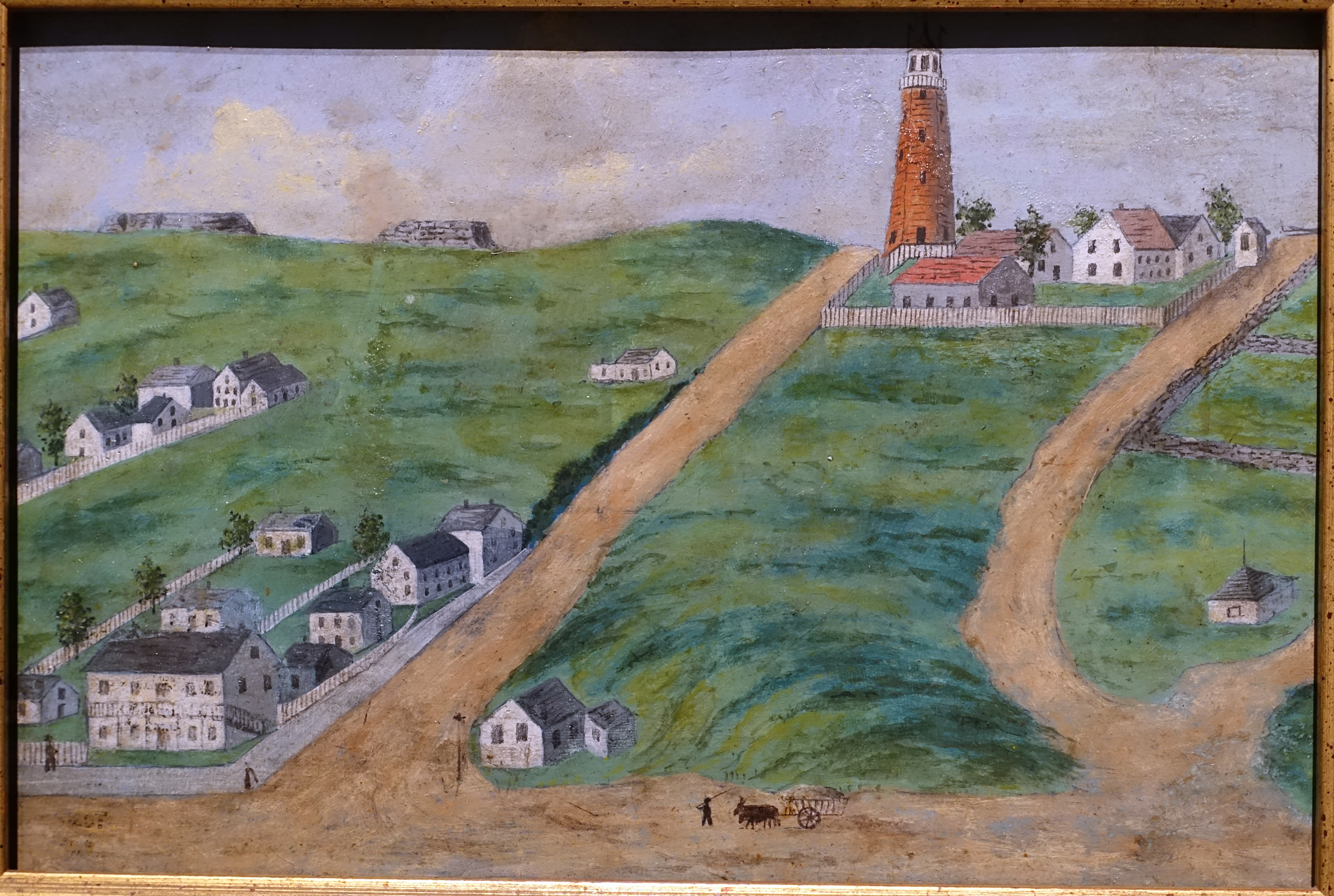
An 1895 painting of Munjoy Hill and the Portland Observatory by an unidentified artist.

On the domestic front, Jefferson supported the idea of coastal forts and small gunboats less than 80 feet long to defend ports and coastal shipping lanes, as an alternative to appropriating funds for a larger, blue-water navy. Three forts along Portland Harbor were built or upgraded during Jefferson's second term: Fort Preble on Spring Point in Cape Elizabeth, named for the late commodore; Fort Scammel (Scammell in many historic accounts) on House Island; and Fort Sumner on Munjoy Hill.

Organized by Lemuel Moody, the Portland Observatory was completed in 1807 on Munjoy Hill as a signal tower to communicate with ships as they approached the harbor, allowing merchants to give wharf longshoremen advance word on ships nearing port. Moody devised a system of flags to signal ships' identities, with the observatory also used to better spot weather fronts approaching the bay.

==== War of 1812 ====
After years of British harassment of U.S. vessels, including the impressment of sailors, President James Madison signed a declaration of war on Great Britain on June 18, 1812.

Portland became the home port for at least nine privateers operating against British merchant shipping, including the 16-gun brig True-Blooded Yankee, which conducted several raids along the coasts of Ireland and Scotland before being captured. The Freeport-built Dash was credited with eight prizes and Dart with five. After USS Enterprise defeated HMS Boxer off Pemaquid Point, U.S. sailors brought the two ships to Portland Harbor and the slain commanders were buried side by side in the city's Eastern Cemetery.

British forces in Halifax launched no major campaigns in Casco Bay during the War of 1812, seizing territory in eastern Maine instead.

The war prompted a fresh review of coastal fortifications by the U.S. Army Corps of Engineers, which eventually resulted in the construction of Fort Gorges on Hog Island Ledge in Portland Harbor.

=== Maine statehood ===
An existing movement for Maine statehood gained adherents after the Treaty of Ghent ended the War of 1812, amid disenchantment with a lack of support from Massachusetts leaders during the British occupation of eastern Maine.

In June 1819, the Massachusetts General Court passed legislation making Maine an independent district from the Commonwealth of Massachusetts, with just over 70% of voters in both Cumberland County and Maine voting in favor of statehood. On March 15, 1820, Maine became the 23rd state as part of the Missouri Compromise approved by Congress and James Madison, with Portland designated the temporary capital until a permanent site could be determined.

In 1821, Cumberland seceded from North Yarmouth, with Chebeague Island becoming part of Cumberland. Throughout the 19th century, Chebeague was a center for the construction of sturdy, gaff-rigged stone sloops designed to handle cargoes of granite, which came into demand nationally for the construction of public buildings and other structures. At the height of demand during the century, 33 quarries along Casco Bay employed between 10,000 and 15,000 quarrymen, cutters, and apprentices.

In 1822, a bridge was built to connect the Falmouth Neck and Cape Elizabeth banks of the Fore River.

In 1825, Lemuel Moody published an updated chart of Casco Bay based on the DesBarres chart, with an inset of Portland Harbor noting newer names of some locales and detailing shallows throughout the bay.

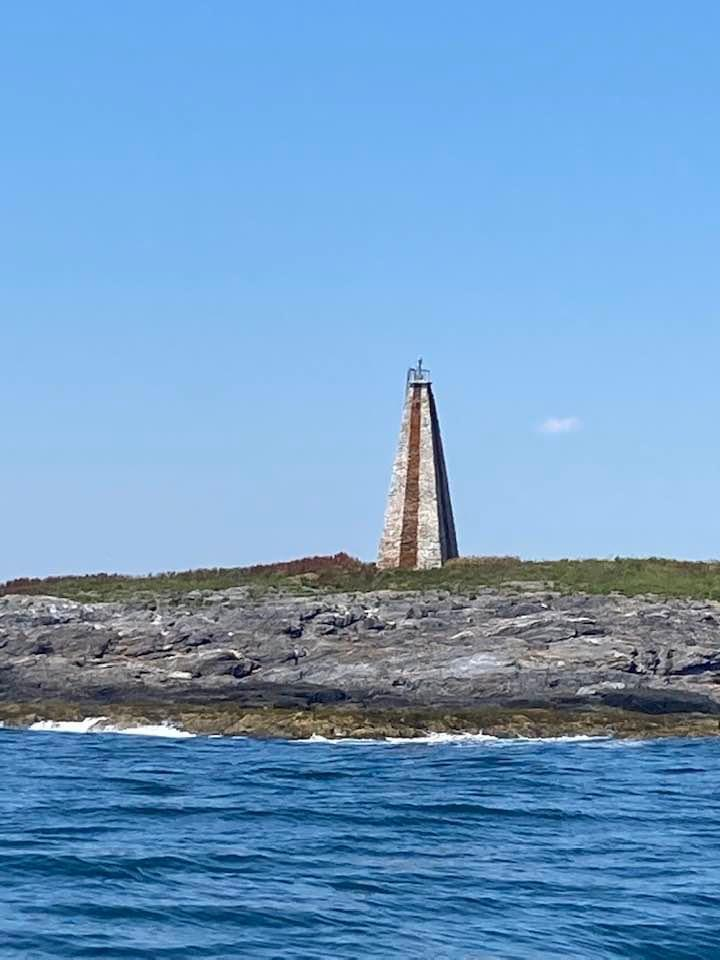
Little Mark Island in Casco Bay, Maine.

In 1827, construction was completed of a stone tower on Little Mark Island at the mouth of Merriconeag Sound to serve as a navigational beacon for ships. The tower included a room at its base to house survivors of shipwrecks until they could be rescued.

According to a ship's list published in November 1828, 15 ships were then based in Portland Harbor.

A pair of stone rubble lighthouses were built that year at the site of today's Two Lights station, at the southwestern entrance to Casco Bay in Cape Elizabeth. The same year, a bridge was built across the mouth of the Presumpscot River connecting Martin's Point in Portland with Falmouth.

In 1828, excavation began on the Cumberland and Oxford Canal. It took two years to complete, creating a navigable waterway from Sebago Lake to Casco Bay. The canal followed the course of the Presumpscot River from Sebago Lake south to Westbrook with locks allowing vessels to negotiate changes in elevation. From there, the canal course cut across to the east bank of the Fore River estuary and into Portland.

The Maine State Legislature declared Augusta the state capital in 1831, with work completed the following year on the original structure of the Maine State House on the west bank of the Kennebec River.

After wharves and buildings in Portland Harbor were destroyed in a November 1831 nor'easter, planning began for a breakwater to protect the harbor. Construction began in 1836, and the breakwater initially extended 1,800 feet. In 1855, a small wooden lighthouse was built at the site of today's Portland Breakwater Light.

In 1835, the state of Maine incurred expenses surveying a potential Brunswick and Casco Bay Railroad. In 1842, Maine's first railway was established with the initiation of service on the Portland, Saco and Portsmouth Railroad connecting Portland to South Berwick. In 1847, a rail yard was established on Turner's Island in the Fore River estuary, followed by what came to be called the Butler Shipyard.

In 1848, four years after John A. Poor proposed it, the St. Lawrence and Atlantic Railroad began service between Portland and Yarmouth (originally known as the Atlantic and St. Lawrence), with the line eventually extended to Montreal. The Grand Trunk Railway acquired the St. Lawrence and Atlantic Railroad in 1853 as part of the Canadian company's expansion into New England. At Poor's urging, a small rail line was laid along the Fore River to link the new railroad to the wharves of Portland Harbor along the new Commercial Street.

West Bath was separated from Bath in 1844. Yarmouth became independent from North Yarmouth in 1849.

In 1859, construction was completed on the U.S. Marine Hospital at Martin's Point at the mouth of the Presumpscot River, to provide medical care for merchant seamen as part of the Marine Hospital Service.

=== Civil War ===
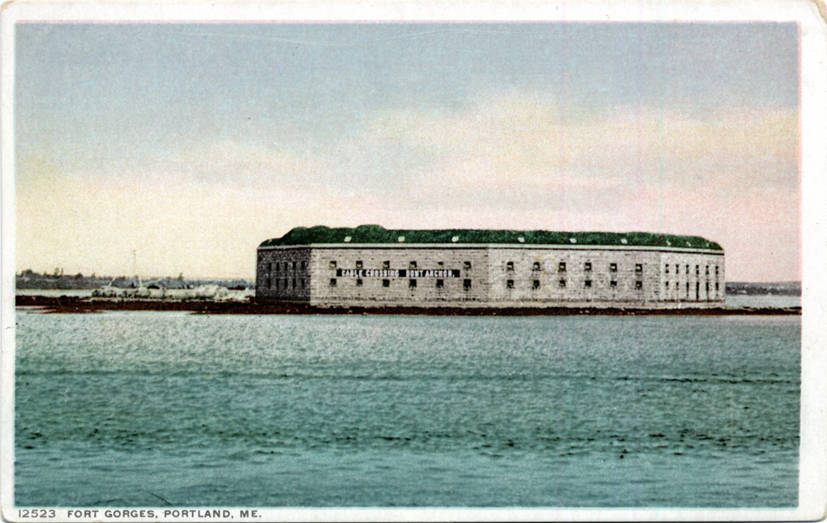
An undated postcard with an artist's rendering of Fort Gorges in Portland Harbor, Maine.

In 1857, Congress approved funding for the construction of Fort Gorges on Hog Island Ledge in Portland Harbor, with the original plan for a fort there conceived after the War of 1812 to provide artillery support against naval attacks for Fort Scammel and Fort Preble. Similar in appearance to Fort Sumter but designed with six sides, Fort Gorges was built of granite starting in 1858. Construction was completed by the end of the American Civil War, but advances in weaponry had rendered the fort obsolete by then.

In June 1863, Confederate Navy raider Charles Read led a boarding party to seize the U.S. revenue cutter Caleb Cushing in Portland Harbor, with the intent to destroy other vessels in the harbor and escape to sea. Abandoning his plan to attack shipping, Read steered the Caleb Cushing out to sea, with two Union steamers running down the ship, which Read scuttled before being captured.

In February 1864, the Montreal Ocean Steamship Company's bark-rigged steamship Bohemian struck Alden's Rock off Cape Elizabeth en route to Portland, with 219 passengers aboard, mostly Irish immigrants, and 99 crew members. As water flooded the ship, the captain was able to maintain steam for the time required to clear the ledge and steer the ship within half a mile of the Cape Elizabeth shore. There, seawater extinguished boiler fires and the crew dropped anchor and deployed lifeboats. Forty-two people perished in the efforts to reach shore.

=== Harbor development and industrialization ===
==== Great Fire of 1866 ====
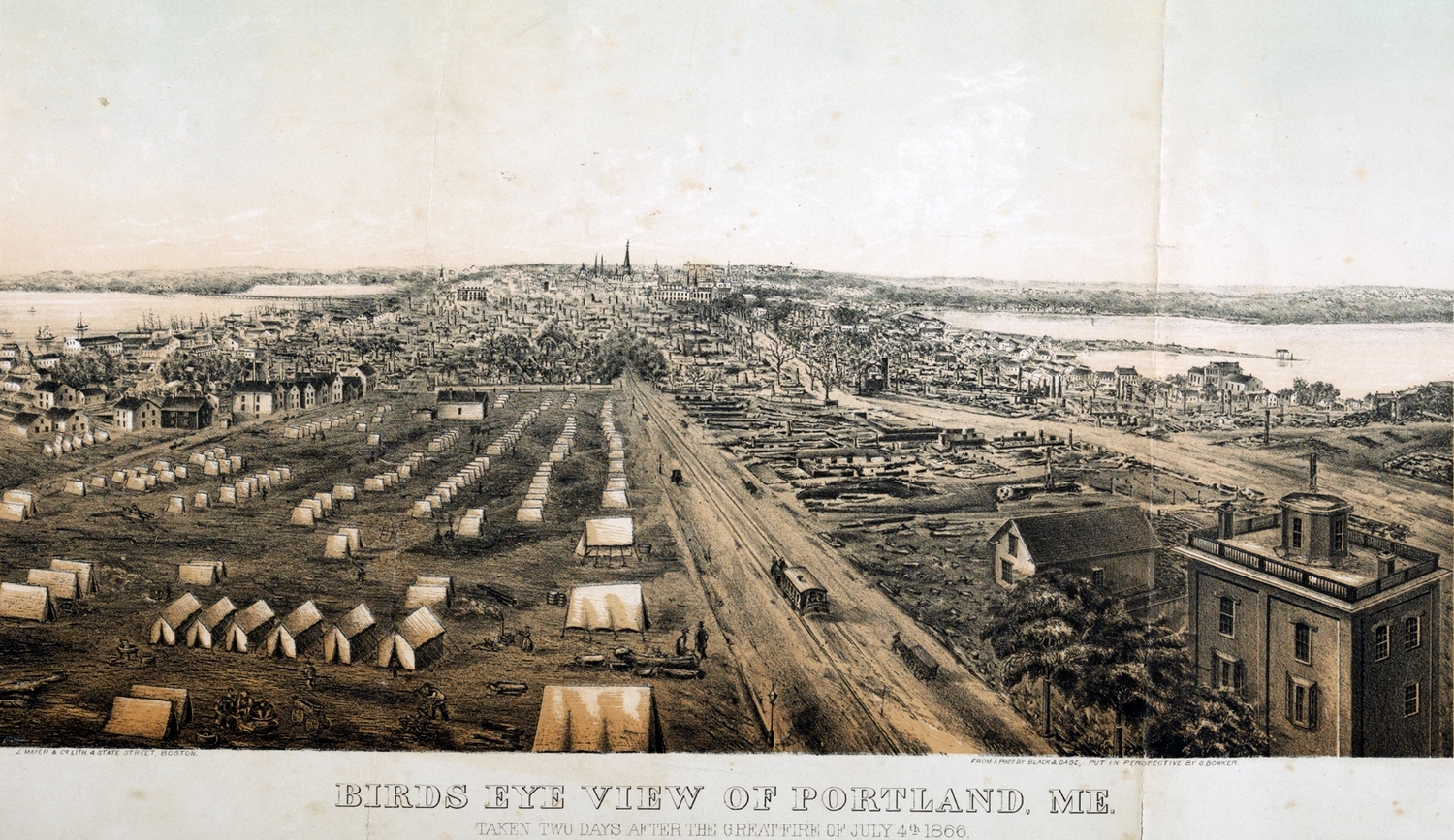
A postcard titled "Birds Eye View of Portland, ME" with a Black & Case photograph taken two days after the great fire of July 4, 1866, from the Portland Observatory.

As of 1866, Portland had about three dozen commercial wharves on Commercial Street and several more on the opposite bank of Portland Harbor in Cape Elizabeth. On July 4 that year, a fire was sparked on a wharf that jumped to nearby buildings and, fanned by strong winds, tore northeast to Munjoy Hill. Photographers captured the destruction. Two people died in the inferno and about 10,000 were left homeless, with the destruction of 1,200 residential structures and about 600 commercial buildings. A tent city was established near the Portland Observatory and donations poured in from New England, Canadian provinces, and other states. Reconstruction proceeded quickly in the next few years, with brick and granite chosen to reduce risk of future fires and the Italianate and Second Empire styles dominating the new architecture. In 1869, an 8-million-US-gallon (30,000 m^{3}) water storage reservoir was built on Bramhall Hill, with a subsequent expansion to 12-million-US-gallon (45,000 m^{3}) capacity.

Organizers formed the Portland Water Company in 1862, to seek the construction of a municipal water system connected to Sebago Lake. Water service commenced on Thanksgiving Day 1869.

After the Great Fire of 1866 destroyed the building that housed offices of the U.S. Customs Service, Congress authorized construction of a new U.S. Custom House on Fore Street near the Portland waterfront. Construction began in 1867 and was completed in 1872. The U.S. Custom House was added to the National Register of Historic Places in 1973.

==== Industrialization and infrastructure ====
Samuel D. Warren purchased a Westbrook paper mill in 1854 and later began adding wood fiber to paper produced at S.D. Warren Paper Mill, as a supplement to rag pulp used for paper production at the time. By the 1880s, S.D. Warren had become the world's largest paper mill. The plant discharged wastewater and pulp used in the production process into the Presumpscot River, in time becoming the largest single source of industrial pollution in the Casco Bay watershed.

In 1865, the Russell Ship Ceiling Co. shipyard was established on the bank of Portland's Eastern Promenade, as shipbuilding accelerated on the shores of Casco Bay.

On September 8, 1869, coastal Maine incurred severe damage in a hurricane, which caused 30 shipwrecks along the coast, including the schooner Helen Eliza, which went aground off Peaks Island, with just one of the vessel's crew of 12 surviving.

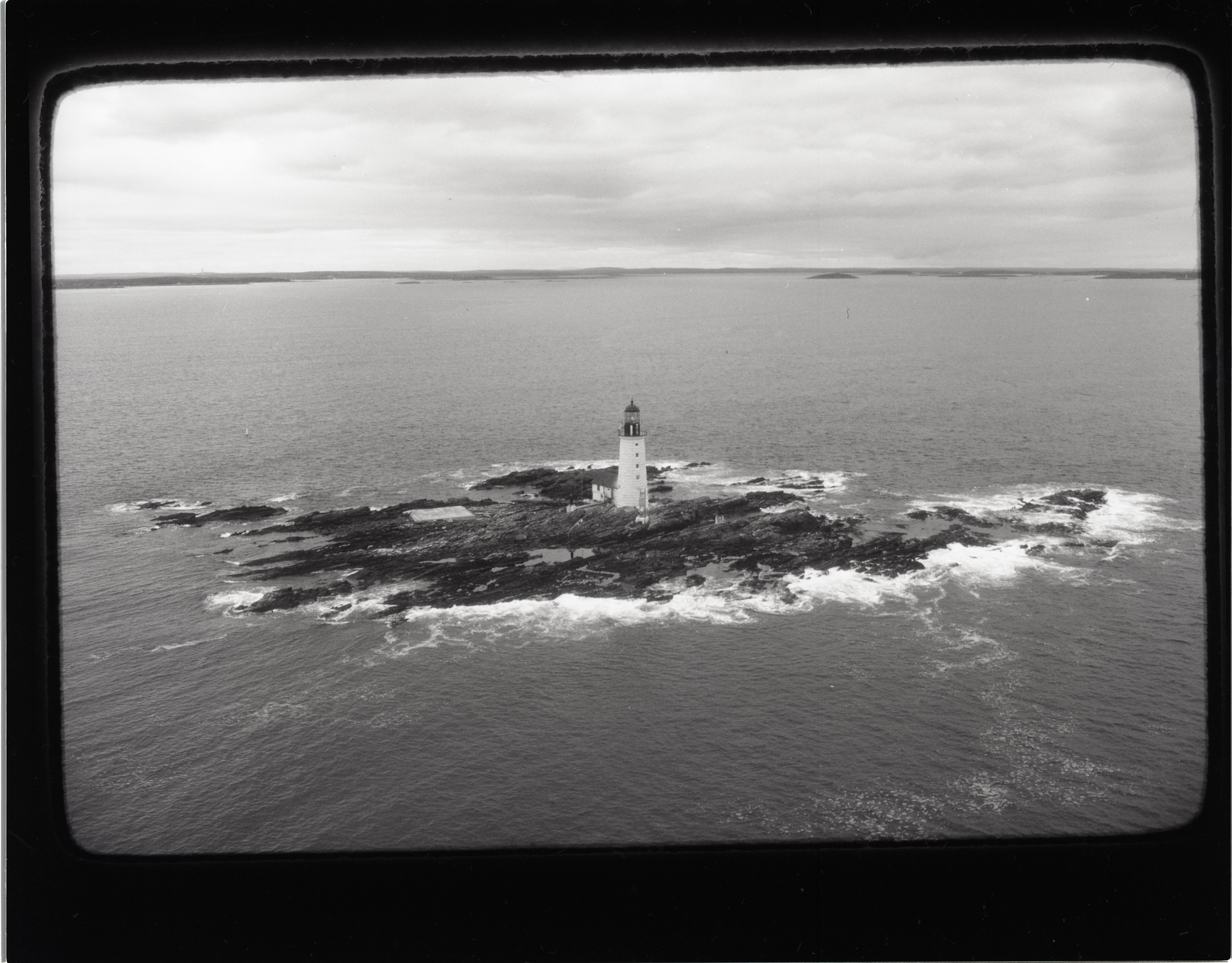
An aerial photo of Halfway Rock in Casco Bay, Maine, taken in October 1977.

After multiple shipwrecks over the preceding decades on shoals at Halfway Rock, in 1869 Congress earmarked funds for construction of a lighthouse there. Work began that year with a temporary shelter erected for workers, given the site's distance from the mainland at the outer edge of Casco Bay. The lighthouse was built primarily from granite quarried on Chebeague Island and hewn into shape on House Island. On August 15, 1871, Halfway Rock Lighthouse began service, with a foghorn added in 1887.

In 1873, the United States Fish Commission undertook an extensive study of fish stocks and habitats in Casco Bay, with survey staff establishing a base of operation and a laboratory on Peaks Island and publishing its findings in 1874. In addition to cataloging fish species, the survey included water temperatures on the surface and bottom, and described the seabed at several locations in the bay.

In 1875, the original Portland Breakwater lighthouse was replaced by a cast-iron lighthouse, known colloquially as Bug Light.

After decades of individual ferry service in Portland Harbor and to outlying islands, including by the Peaks Island Steamboat Company, successor firm Casco Bay Steamboat Company was incorporated in 1878 to provide regular scheduled service, followed in 1881 by the Harpswell Steamboat Company. The companies merged in 1910 to form Casco Bay Lines. In 1885, the People's Ferry Company was founded to provide service in Portland Harbor, with service extending to Peaks Island.

Dockworkers formed the Portland Longshoremans Benevolent Society labor union in 1880, with membership peaking within two decades at 868.

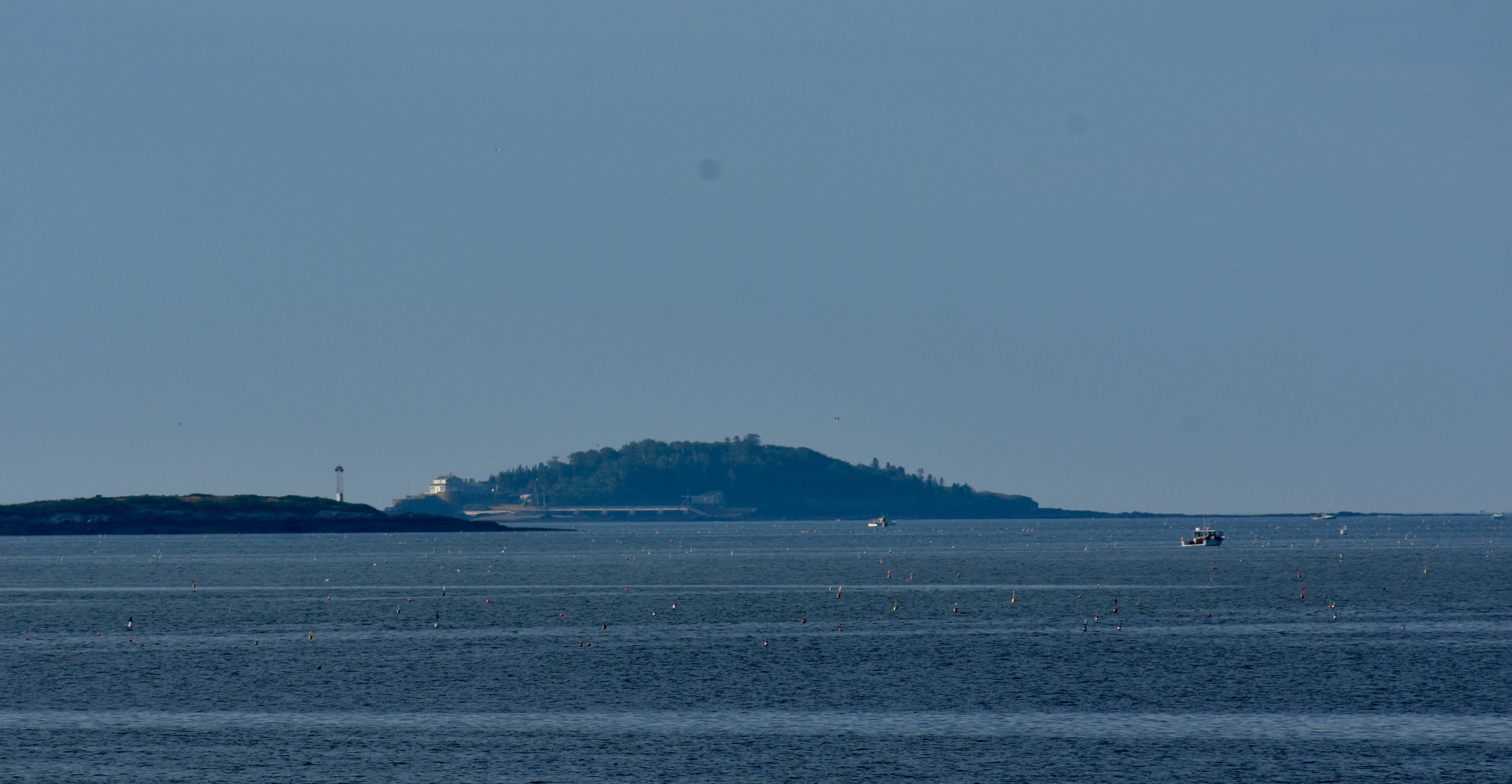
Eagle Island in Casco Bay, where the Eagle Island State Historic Park includes the historic home of arctic explorer Robert Peary.

In 1881, Robert Peary purchased an island off Harpswell Neck called Sawungun and renamed it Eagle Island, before enlisting in the U.S. Navy and undertaking a series of expeditions to explore territories north of the Arctic Circle. Peary used nearby Upper Flag Island as a place to keep his arctic sled dogs, and over time purchased several other Casco Bay islands including Crab Island, Basket Island, Great Mark Island, Horse Island, Pound of Tea and Shelter Island.

The Consolidated Electric Light Company of Maine established three steam-powered generators to produce electricity in the Portland area starting in 1883. In 1912, it merged with the Portland Electric Company to form the Cumberland County Power and Light Company.

With scheduled ferry service to Peaks Island, the Greenwood Gardens amusement district took shape on the island in the 1880s. It eventually included a boardwalk, inns, eateries, a dance hall, a Ferris wheel, a bowling alley, an observation tower, a roller skating rink, and the 1,500-seat Gem Theatre.

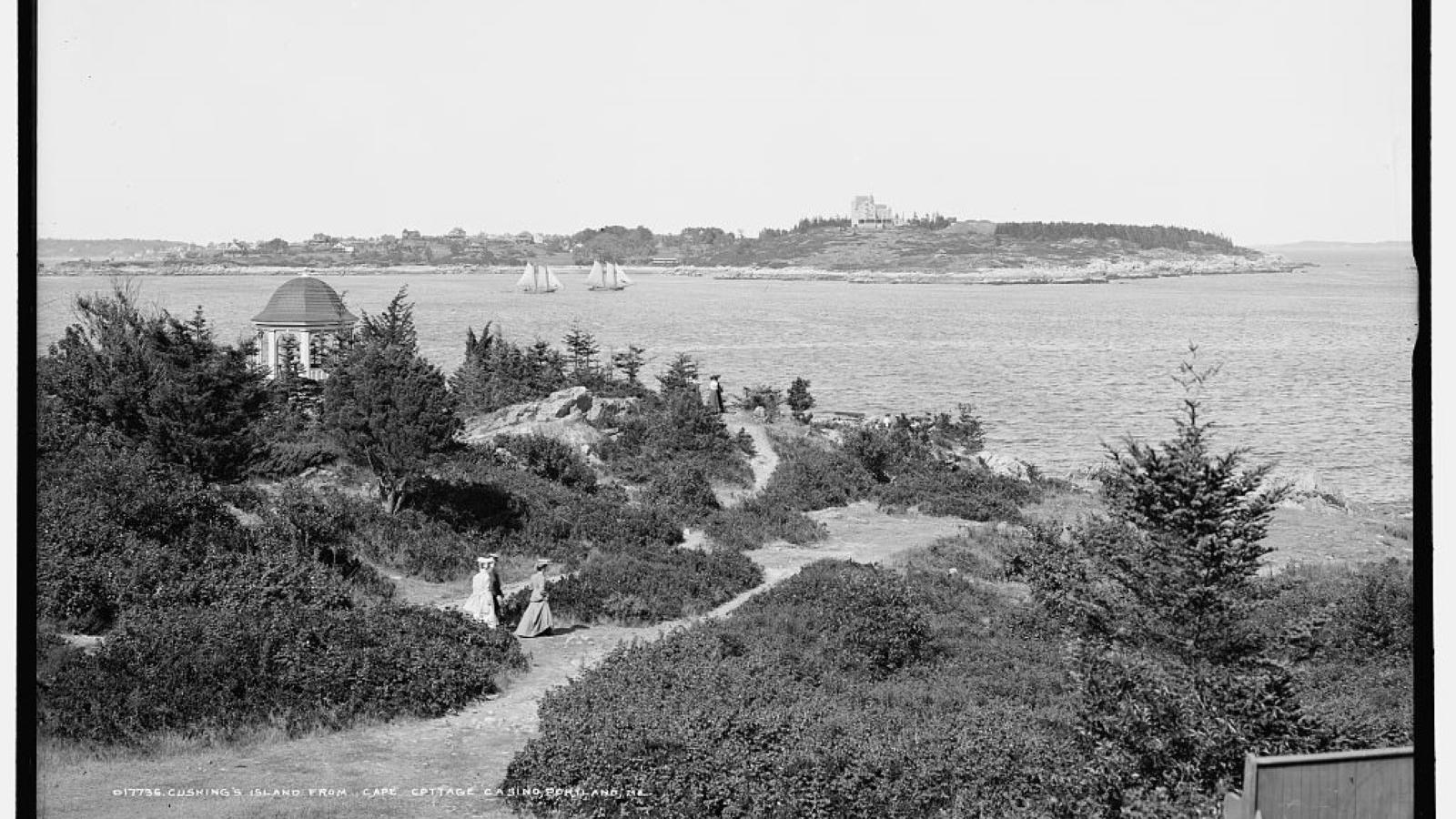
Cushing Island on Casco Bay in Portland, Maine, from Cape Cottage Casino in Cape Elizabeth.

Francis Cushing hired Frederick Law Olmsted in 1882 to plan a landscape design for the entirety of Cushing Island, with an eye on establishing a summer resort on the 266-acre island.

After reports of an event in which those aboard a stricken vessel just off Cape Elizabeth pleaded to people on shore for a lifeboat—none were on hand and several people perished in the ensuing wreck—a United States Life-Saving Service station was established in 1888 at Dyer Cove in Cape Elizabeth. The U.S. Life Saving Service was merged in 1915 with the Revenue Cutter Service to form the U.S. Coast Guard, which established a new station in South Portland.

In January 1891, the coal schooner Ada Barker went aground on Junk of Pork near Outer Green Island. The crew clambered onto the rock along the collapsed foremast, with minutes to spare before the waves smashed the escape route and the larger ship. The crew survived on the rock until the U.S. revenue cutter Levi Woodbury rescued them after hours of exposure to the storm.

In 1892, Portland established a quarantine station on House Island for newly arrived immigrants to reduce the threat of epidemics in the city. The federal government absorbed the immigration and quarantine station in 1907 and ran it for three decades. Some called the island the "Ellis Island of the North".

Six people died in the wreck of the 126-foot schooner Susan P. Thurlow in December 1897, after a rudder failure during a storm as the captain steered for Portland Harbor. One member of the crew survived after the ship struck a ledge off Cushing Island.

In 1897, construction was completed on Spring Point Ledge Light in Portland Harbor. The next year, South Portland was created as a municipality independent of Cape Elizabeth. The municipality of Deering was split off from Westbrook in 1871, and Portland absorbed Deering in 1899.

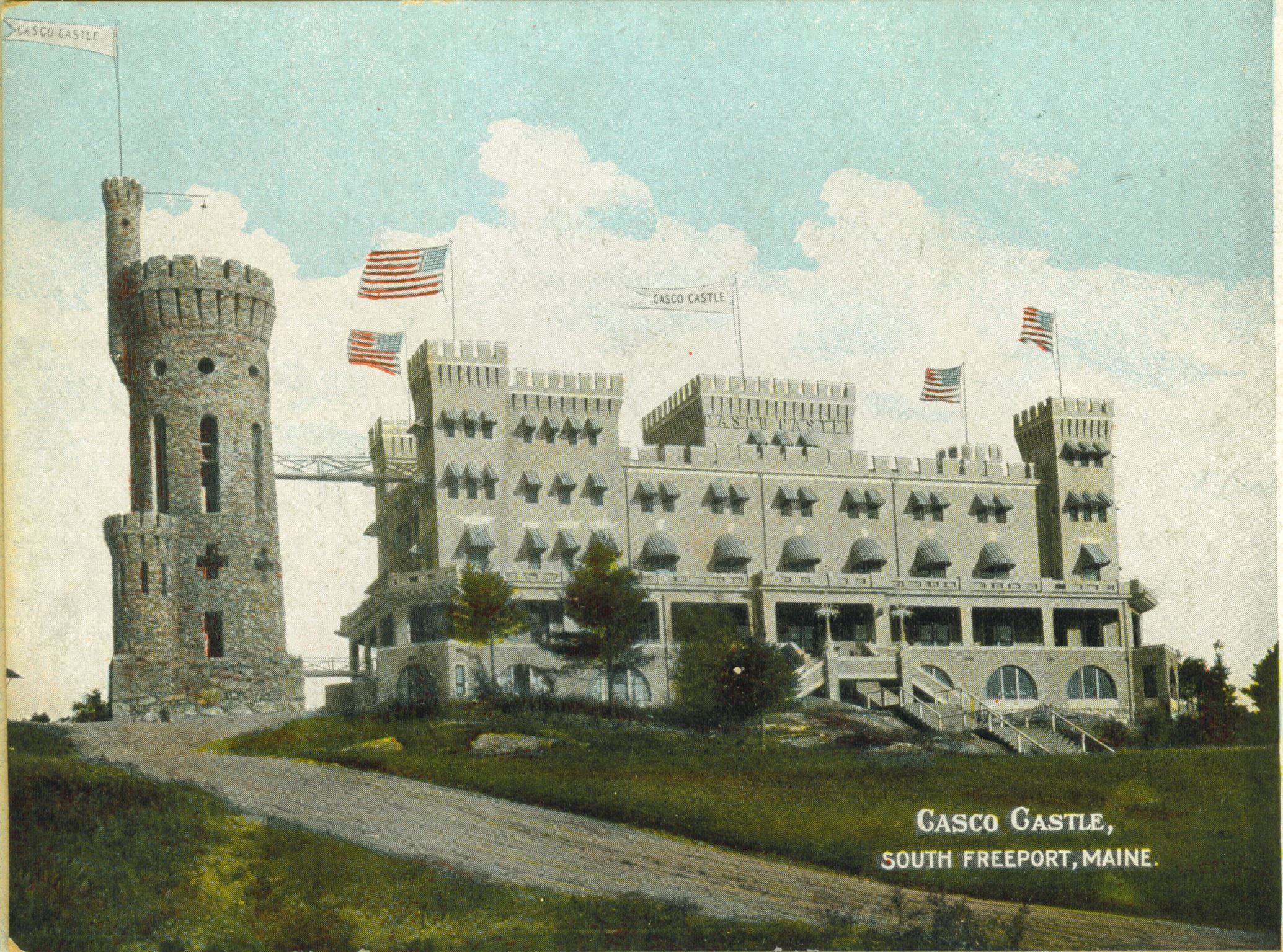
A postcard with a depiction of the historic Casco Castle resort in South Freeport, Maine, overlooking the Harraseeket River and Casco Bay.

The Portland and Yarmouth Electric Railway was established in 1898, four years after its charter by Maine's state legislature, and eventually ran service between the municipalities on a half-hour schedule and underwrote the construction of the Underwood Spring Park casino resort in Falmouth to spur ridership. The Portland and Brunswick Street Railway launched trolley service in 1902, connecting Yarmouth and Brunswick with a stop at the Casco Castle resort in South Freeport on the Harraseeket River overlooking Casco Bay. Electric trolley service was also extended south of Portland via the Portland and Cape Elizabeth Electric Railway, with stops at the Willard Beach Casino in South Portland and subsequently the Cape Cottage Casino in Cape Elizabeth.

In 1901, former governor and Civil War hero Joshua Chamberlain purchased Crow Island located at the junction of Merepoint Bay and Middle Bay.

At the outbreak of the Spanish-American War in 1898, the U.S. Navy dispatched the Civil War–era USS Montauk to guard Portland Harbor. Construction began that year on Fort Levett on Cushing Island and was nearing completion at Fort Williams in Cape Elizabeth, where multiple gun batteries were installed.

With preparatory work having already started on Fort McKinley on Great Diamond Island, construction proceeded on the fort during the Spanish-American War. Fort McKinley eventually became Casco Bay's largest military installation. On adjacent Cow Island, Fort Lyon was built in stages after 1900 for additional coverage of the Hussey Sound passage into the inner harbor. Both forts had facilities to support harbor defensive mining operations, and guns to engage enemy minesweepers in Hussey Sound.

In an August 1903 military exercise in Casco Bay, the U.S. Navy tested its ability to assault a fortified harbor like Portland with a large fleet of battleships, cruisers, destroyers and other combat and support ships, and the Army's ability to defend shore installations. In addition to artillery batteries at Forts McKinley, Preble, Levett, Lyon and Williams, the war game included beach assaults by the U.S. Marine Corps at Long Island and other sites. The exercise drew throngs of civilians to the shore to watch the mock assault.

Lightship LV 74 was launched in 1902 as the last wooden lightship built for the U.S. Coast Guard. The vessel was named Cape Elizabeth and stationed off the coast there, and renamed Portland in 1912. After a series of groundings, construction began in 1903 on Ram Island Ledge Light in Portland Harbor. The lighthouse was completed in 1905.

In 1911, Maine's legislature authorized the formation of the Island Light & Water Co. to provide electricity, gas, and water service on Cushing, Great Diamond, and Little Diamond islands.

In 1912, Maine Governor Frederick W. Plaisted approved the eviction of residents of Malaga Island, just off Phippsburg, after years of gossip and negative news articles about the island's population which was racially diverse and living on subsistence income. In 2023, Malaga Island was added to the National Register of Historic Places, becoming the second island in Casco Bay to be listed in its entirety after Eagle Island.

With Long Island among Casco Bay's leisure destinations in the early 20th century, a June 1914 fire destroyed much of the island's business district, including the waterfront Granite Springs Hotel.

The Million Dollar Bridge was completed in 1916 over the Fore River between Portland and South Portland, with the bascule bridge replacing the existing span that dated to 1822.

=== World War I ===
When World War I broke out in Europe in 1914 and German U-boats began attacking shipping in the Atlantic, Congress passed the National Defense Act of 1916, which set in motion major investments in U.S. ship construction and coastal defense.

In March 1917, John Poor died of a gunshot wound sustained during an exchange of fire while he was on nighttime sentry duty at Fort Williams. He had challenged two men who had infiltrated the base where Poor was assigned as a private to the U.S. Army Coast Artillery Corps. Poor is thought to have been the first U.S. soldier to die in the line of duty during World War I, before the U.S. declared war on Germany. It was the first of multiple such incidents in the Portland area that spring. The Lewiston Evening Journal reported that "suspicious characters have been observed at all the fortifications in the Portland district."

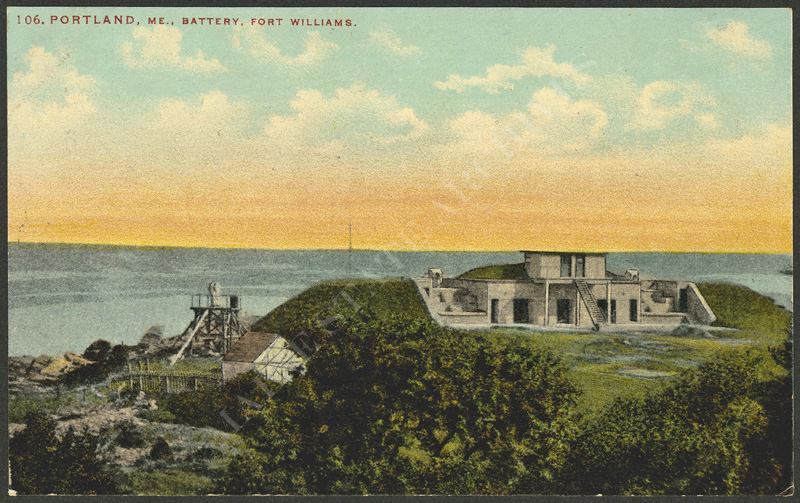
A vintage postcard depicting Battery Blair at Fort Williams in Cape Elizabeth, Maine, overlooking Casco Bay.

Under the initial command of Major General Clarence Edwards, the Army's Northeastern Department garrisoned coastal artillery batteries at existing forts on the Casco Bay shore and islands. Fort Williams was the headquarters of the coastal defenses for the Portland district overseeing Forts Levett, Lyon, McKinley, and Preble in Casco Bay, along with Fort Baldwin and Fort Popham in Phippsburg. Fort Scammel on House Island was classified as an inactive station, and land on Peaks Island, Long Island, and Crow Island adjacent to Great Diamond was listed as reservations for military needs. A wireless telegraphy station was established at Fort Levett on Cushing Island, and Fort Gorges became a depot for the storage of mines and munitions. In April, the War Department authorized a Reserve Officers' Training Corps program at Bowdoin College in Brunswick.

Multiple Casco Bay shipyards built wooden Ferris-type ships for North Atlantic cargo duties, including Cumberland Shipbuilding in South Portland, the Portland Ship Ceiling Co., successor company Russell Shipbuilding, and Freeport Shipbuilding on the Harraseeket River.

With leisure spending dropping sharply during the war years, the Casco Bay and Harpswell Lines could not generate enough revenue to keep up with needed repairs for its ferries, and, facing liens on debt, declared bankruptcy in July 1919. Edward B. Winslow purchased the company and reorganized Casco Bay Lines to resume service the next spring, initially with a fleet of four ferries.

=== Roaring Twenties and Great Depression ===
Two years after creating a state harbor commission, in 1919 Maine's legislature authorized a $1.15 million bond issue to finance construction of a new wharf facility in Portland, in recognition of advancements in cargo handling at competing New England and Canadian ports. Initially designed with a length of 1,000 feet and the harbor bottom dredged 35 feet deep, the Maine State Pier was completed in 1923.

In 1921, the Great Chebeague Golf Club opened for play on the northern end of Chebeague Island with a nine-hole layout, and every hole having a view of Casco Bay. The course was added to the National Register of Historic Places in 2015.

The Peaks Island Corporation was formed to provide electricity and water service on Peaks Island, initiating service in 1922 and five years later renamed the Casco Bay Light & Water Company.

In December 1925, while moored in Portland Harbor, the six-masted schooner Edward J. Lawrence caught fire. A fireboat crew could not extinguish the blaze, and the ship sank in flames as thousands of onlookers watched from the Eastern Prom and elsewhere. The ship was moved north of Fort Gorges, where it sank.

Organizers staged the inaugural Peaks to Portland Swim in August 1927, with Portland resident Wendell Willworth winning the 2.4 mile harbor race with a time of two hours and 33 minutes.

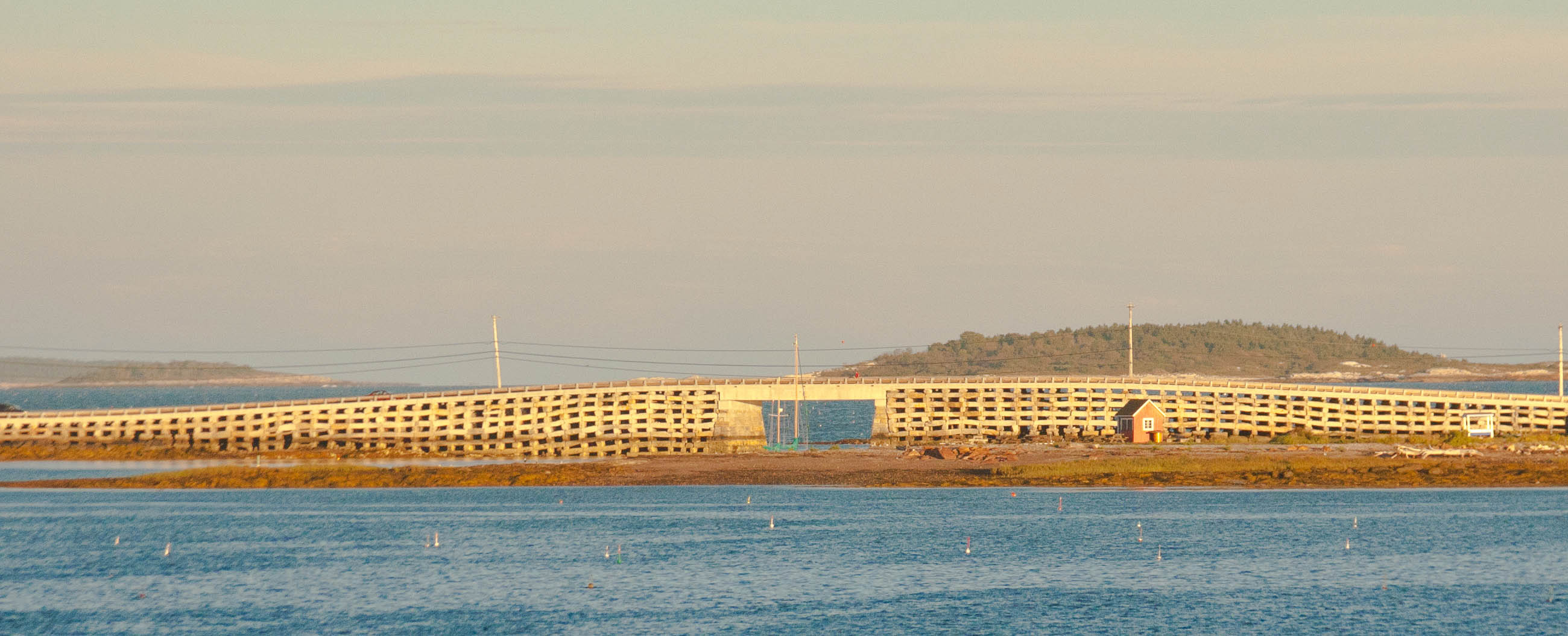
The Bailey Island Bridge connecting Bailey and Orr's islands in Casco Bay, Maine.

Construction began that year on the Bailey Island Bridge. It opened in 1928, spanning Will's Gut to Orr's Island, after studies on designs to minimize the granite span's impact on tidal currents and to withstand the effects of ice. Thought to be the only such design in the United States, the Bailey Island Bridge was named a National Historic Civil Engineering Landmark in 1984, one of three Casco Bay structures on the list, along with Portland Head Light and the Portland Observatory.

With organizers drawing inspiration from the offshore Newport Bermuda Race, the Portland Yacht Club held the inaugural Monhegan Island Race in 1928, with five local yachts entered in the regatta along with a sixth that was cruising in the area. Saracen crossed the finish line third behind the Universal P-class yachts Sayonara II and Nahma, but with rules in place that precluded P-class boats from qualifying for the trophy, Saracen was named the winner.

In 1931, Stroudwater Airport commenced service with a Boston & Maine Airways flight after expanding an existing private airfield along the Fore River in Portland. As part of Franklin D. Roosevelt's New Deal programs to rebuild the U.S. economy during the Great Depression, the Maine Emergency Relief Administration added two runways in 1934 and 1935, and the airport was renamed the Portland-Westbrook Municipal Airport. MERA also built a civilian airfield in Brunswick.

In 1938, the competition that came to be known as the Bailey Island Fishing Tournament held its first event for anglers of bluefin tuna.

The Gem Theater burned down on Peaks Island in 1934, and two years later a group of buildings at the island's Forest City Landing were destroyed by fire.

=== World War II ===
On September 3, 1939, the United Kingdom declared war on Germany, commencing the Battle of the Atlantic. Two days letter, Roosevelt declared U.S. neutrality in the conflict, with a Neutrality Patrol established to monitor for any activities of belligerent vessels in U.S. territorial waters.

With Canadian oil supplies disrupted by the threat of German U-boats, construction commenced on the Portland-Montreal pipeline, which had its main southern terminal in South Portland on the Fore River.

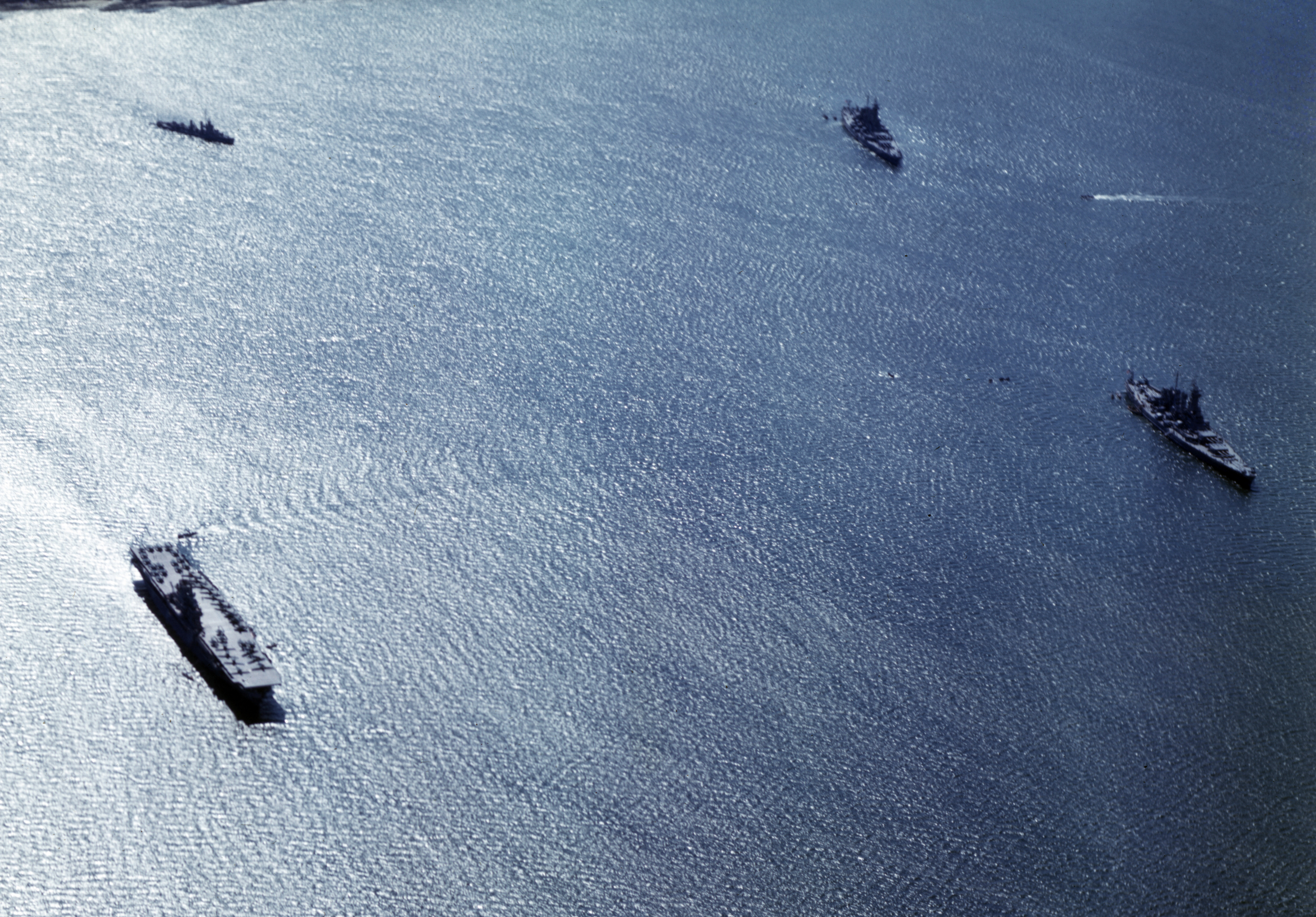
The U.S. Navy aircraft carrier USS Wasp (CV-7) at anchor in March 1942 in Casco Bay, alongside the battleships USS North Carolina (BB-55) and USS Washington (BB-56).

Since Casco Bay was the nearest American anchorage to the Atlantic Lend-Lease convoy routes to Britain until the U.S. entered World War II, Admiral Ernest J. King ordered a large pool of destroyers to be stationed there for convoy escort duty in August 1941. On December 11, 1941, the United States and Germany declared a state of war, four days after Japan's attack on Pearl Harbor. On the day of the Pearl Harbor attack, battleships USS Arkansas (BB-33), USS North Carolina (BB-55) and USS Texas (BB-35) were in Casco Bay.

In the months leading up to the war declaration and afterward, U.S. Army Brigadier General Robert C. Garrett was commander of the Harbor Defenses of Portland based at Fort Williams in Cape Elizabeth. In May 1941, the Harbor Defense Headquarters Battery was formed to oversee the 8th Coast Artillery and the 240th Coast Artillery regiment of the Maine Army National Guard.

As an initial defense against incursions by enemy submarines into Portland's harbor, the U.S. government purchased derelict schooners and scuttled them in the outer harbor channels. The U.S. Navy went on to install indicator loop cables along the seabed that were designed to produce a recordable amount of voltage when a submarine passed above, though the system was prone to glitches and occasional erroneous recordings. An outer indicator loop ran from the southern tip of Staples Cove in Cape Elizabeth northeast to a point just east of Halfway Rock, then north to Land's End on Bailey Island. A second indicator loop was installed closer to the island channels to the anchorages of Portland Harbor and Falmouth, running northeast from Fort Williams to a point west of Peaks Island, then north to Long Island. Hydrophones were installed along portions of the inner indicator loop. In June 1942, the system detected the possible entrance of a U-boat into the eastern section of Casco Bay.

Minefields blocked the channels to Portland Harbor including between Cape Elizabeth and Cushing Island and Ram Island Ledge, and northeast from there to Outer Green Island. Anti-submarine nets were also placed in Whitehead Passage between Cushing and Peaks; in Hussey Sound between Peaks and Long Island; and in channels between Long Island and Chebeague Island; Chebeague and Littlejohn Island; and Cousins Island and Yarmouth.

In 1942, construction began on Battery Steele on Peaks Island, where a pair of 16-inch Mark 2 guns were emplaced, matching the caliber on battleships of the day. The Battery Steele guns could fire projectiles 26 miles, giving them the range to cover all of Casco Bay and as far south as Kennebunk. Peaks Island was also the site of Battery Craven, whose six-inch guns had a range of about 15 miles, while Battery Foote guns at Fort Levett on Cushing Island could cover an arc extending from the Saco River to the outlying sections of Harpswell.

Towers for fire control, observation, or radar were built on the shores of outlying islands, including Long, Peaks, Cushing, Jewell, and Bailey Islands, to scan the horizon for aircraft or ships and help coastal artillery crews at Battery Steele and other artillery posts triangulate on targets approaching Casco Bay. Fire control towers were also built on the mainland, including in Cape Elizabeth just south of Dyer Point, at Trundy Point, and on the opposite end of the bay at Small Point in Phippsburg.

Under U.S. Coast Guard and Navy regulations, maps were distributed to show commercial and leisure boat operators sections of the bay that were off limits, and the lanes boats could traverse. Vessel operators had to pass through a U.S. Coast Guard control point before continuing through gates in the submarine netting to waters outside the control zone. Passengers had to carry identification cards, and cameras were forbidden.

In June 1941, the 44-foot cabin cruiser Don departed Harpswell for a clambake on Monhegan Island with at least 34 people aboard. The boat never returned amid hazy weather and fog later in the day, with contacts on Monhegan Island reporting Don never arrived. No one survived the excursion, and no conclusive evidence surfaced of what befell Don and its passengers. A board of investigations cited the possibility that the boat capsized in a groundswell after several days of strong winds, with the boat's stability compromised by the large number of people on board.

The Navy established a fuel annex on Long Island with lengthy piers to fuel naval and cargo ships.

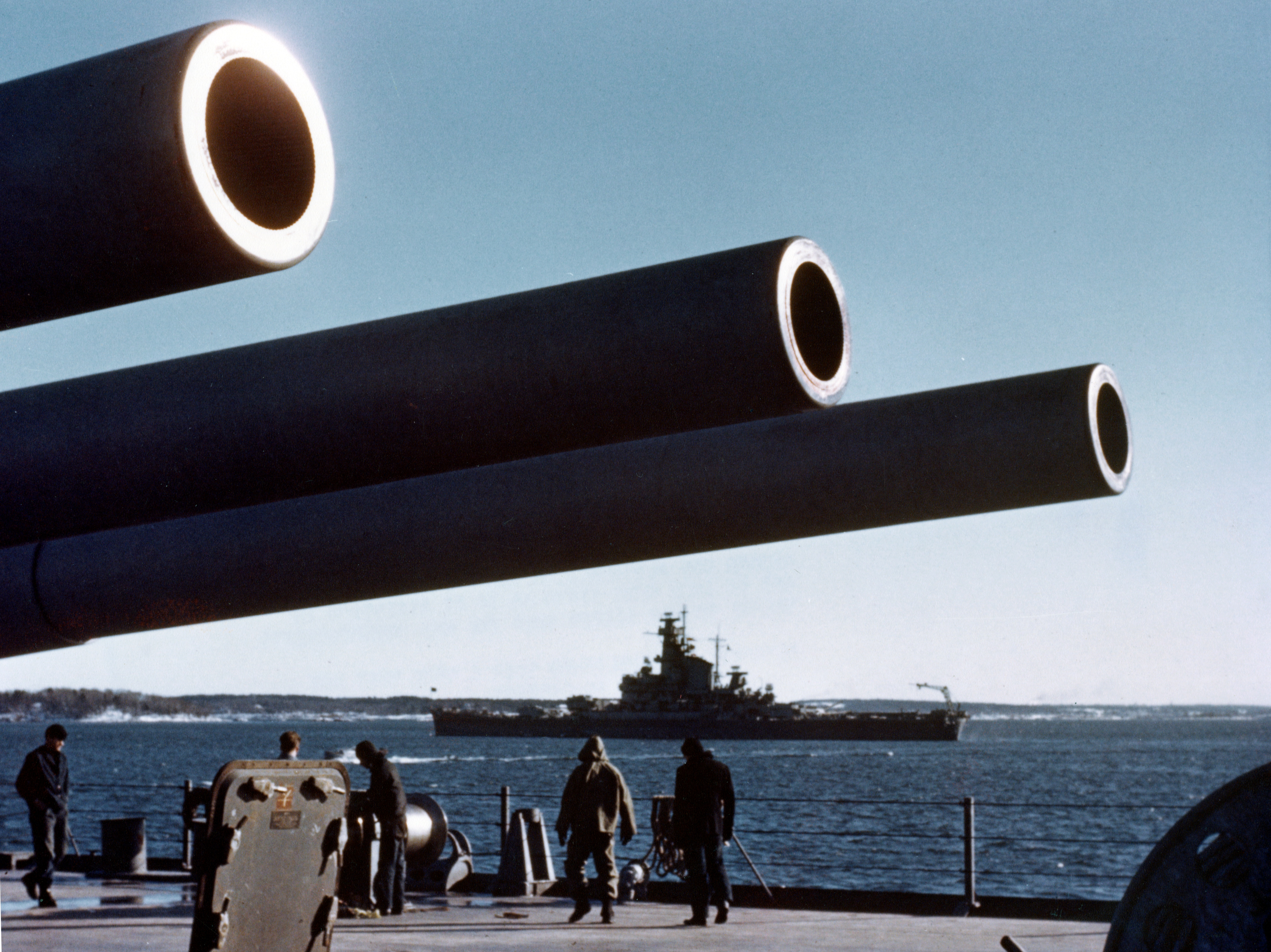
The U.S. Navy battleship USS Massachusetts (BB-59) seen from the deck of USS Alabama (BB-60), in January 1943 in Casco Bay.

On March 26, 1942, U.S. Navy Task Force 39 became the first to sortie from Casco Bay, for Scapa Flow in Scotland to support convoy operations. Task force ships included aircraft carrier USS Wasp (CV-7), battleship USS Washington (BB-56), heavy cruisers USS Tuscaloosa (CA-37) and USS Wichita (CA-45), and four destroyers.

In April 1943, the Brunswick airfield built with New Deal funding was commissioned as Naval Air Station Brunswick, as a maritime reconnaissance base and training field for Royal Canadian Air Force and British Royal Navy pilots.

A Naval Auxiliary Air Facility was also established on Long Island to support seaplanes launched by catapult from larger warships, for use in reconnaissance and to direct naval gun fire at long ranges.

In addition to convoy preparation, Casco Bay was used for naval training and shakedown cruises to assess newly built or refurbished vessels. After Italy's armistice in September 1943, three Italian U-boats were assigned to Casco Bay for destroyer training exercises in U-boat detection and engagement.

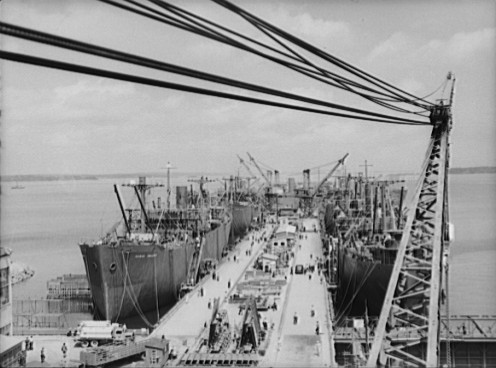
Liberty ships being fitted out for convoy duties in August 1942 at New England Shipbuilding Corp., in South Portland, Maine.

In 1940, the Todd-Bath Iron Shipbuilding Corporation was established in South Portland as an affiliate of Todd-Bath Shipyards of New York, after the British Purchasing Commission awarded a contract for the construction of 30 ocean-class cargo ships for war service. Todd-Bath Iron Shipbuilding set up seven ways to build and launch ships. The next year, a second shipyard, South Portland Shipbuilding, added four more ways for ship construction. In 1943, the two companies merged into a single entity, the New England Shipbuilding Corporation. At its peak during the war years, New England Shipbuilding employed 30,000 workers.

New England Shipbuilding was one of 18 major shipyards that received contracts to build American-designed Liberty-class cargo and transport ships for transatlantic duty.

In 1943, former Maine Governor Percival P. Baxter donated Mackworth Island to the state, which designated the island a state park in 1946.

On April 23, 1945, several miles off Cape Elizabeth, USS Eagle 56 became the next-to-last U.S. Navy warship sunk during World War II, after a torpedo attack by the German U-boat U-853. Forty-nine crew members died in the attack, with 13 rescued. The destroyer USS Selfridge (DD-357) dropped depth charges after a sonar contact, but U-853 was able to evade the attack.

On May 8, the day after Germany's unconditional surrender to Allied forces, U-boat U-805 became the first German U-boat to send a signal of its commander's intent to surrender. A boarding party from a U.S. destroyer-escort instructed the commander to steer U-805 to Casco Bay, with the surrender effected on May 15.

In October 1946, New England Shipbuilding launched the last of the 266 Liberty ships it built in South Portland, more than a year after the surrender of Japan ended World War II.

Records show that 770 ships passed through Casco Bay between January 1941 and January 1947, with as many as 140 more possibly having done so.

In 1948, the federal War Assets Administration put multiple island military reservations up for sale in Casco Bay, including Cow Island, Great Diamond Island, Little Chebeague Island and shorefront property on Long Island, with World War II veterans given priority for any purchases.

=== Modern era ===
After World War II ended, returning service personnel produced a housing boom and economic expansion.

In March 1947, the loaded coal steamer Oakley L. Alexander went aground off Cape Elizabeth. The captain later reported that an 80-foot rogue wave hit the vessel and broke off a large section of its bow. Hundreds of people gathered on shore to watch the rescue effort, including schoolchildren who were bused to the shore. A U.S. Coast Guardsman launched a line to the stricken ship with a Lyle gun, and all 32 crew members came ashore with the assistance of a life preserver on the line, as waves crashed over them at intervals along the way.

The U.S. Navy undertook construction in 1953 of a jet fuel depot on the western side of Harpswell, with 14 storage tanks and a pipeline to the Brunswick Naval Air Station. The federal government transferred the property in 2001 to the Town of Harpswell, with depot infrastructure removed to transform the 120-acre property into a public park, and voters approving in 2024 construction of a boat launch.

A Gulf Oil tanker went aground off Bailey Island in December 1953. The captain pumped at least 3,000 gallons of gasoline into Casco Bay to lighten the ship in an effort to free it from the ledge. It was the first recorded instance of a fuel spill in Casco Bay at the time of a 1973 Research Institute of the Gulf of Maine study commissioned by the state of Maine, with the study tracking 336 oil and fuel spills in Portland's vicinity.

Another Fore River bridge opened in 1954 connecting Portland and South Portland, west of the Million Dollar Bridge.

Ten days after Hurricane Carol caused damage in coastal areas in Maine in 1954, Hurricane Edna hit on September 11, causing massive damage as torrential rains unleashed floods that destroyed some bridges and washed away railroad tracks.

In 1955, construction was completed on the Ellis C. Snodgrass Memorial Bridge connecting Cousins Island to Yarmouth. The bridge gave construction vehicles access to the island to build the Wyman Station power plant on the island's western tip to generate electricity for Central Maine Power.

The Portland School for The Deaf relocated to Mackworth Island in 1957, with a vehicular causeway connecting the island to the mainland in Falmouth. The school was renamed the Maine School for the Deaf, then the Governor Baxter School for the Deaf.

The federal government sold the former Cape Elizabeth Military Reservation to the state of Maine. The state opened the 41-acre Two Lights State Park at the site in 1961.

The tanker Northern Gulf struck West Cod Ledge off Two Lights State Park in November 1963, spilling at least 20,000 gallons of oil into waters at the outer edge of Casco Bay. The oil slick eventually washed up on shores north of Casco Bay after a storm. A federal judge ruled the U.S. Coast Guard was to blame for the accident, by failing to ensure that a buoy for navigation was in the correct position.

A company called King Resources acquired the historic naval fuel annex on Long Island in 1969 from the federal government, with plans to expand the facility to become a major crude oil import terminal and supertanker port. With the project delayed as a result of opposition by community and environmental groups, King Resources never proceeded with the Long Island terminal and eventually sold the property to a real estate development firm.

In 1969, Wolfe's Neck Woods State Park was established on 244 acres of land in Freeport, on the peninsula formed by the Harraseeket River and Casco Bay.

Lion Ferry established seasonal service in 1970 at International Marine Terminal in Portland for ferry service to and from Yarmouth, Nova Scotia, initially on the ferry ships M/S Prince of Fundy and MS Bolero followed by MS Caribe. Lion Ferry sold the route in 1982 to Prince of Fundy Cruises under Panamanian-based Transworld Steamship Company, which began service with M/S Scotia Prince. The ship and line were purchased in 2000 by a group of investors and renamed Scotia Prince Cruises. After the discovery of mold at International Marine Terminal, the 2005 Scotia Prince Cruises season was cancelled and the city of Portland ended the company's lease.

In July 1972, the Wilh. Wilhelmsen tanker Tamano scraped Soldier Ledge while traversing Hussey Sound, tearing open a section of its hull along a starboard tank. With the ship's contact with the ledge initially unnoticed by the crew, Tamano continued to a ship anchorage and oil transfer area between Long Island and Clapboard Island. An estimated 100,000 gallons of No. 6 fuel oil leaked into Casco Bay, with at least 30,000 gallons escaping containment booms set up around the ship for skimming operations. Over two weeks of containment and cleanup before Tamano departed Casco Bay for dry dock repairs, oil was observed on 18 islands and 46 miles of coastline from Yarmouth to York. Oil-contaminated sand six inches deep was removed from West Beach on Long Island and transported to a landfill at Naval Air Station Brunswick, while contaminated straw used to absorb oil in the water, seaweed, and other debris was burned at a site in Gray.

After dead seabirds were found in September 1972 in Massachusetts, a researcher at the University of Massachusetts Marine Lab in Gloucester discovered algae in seawater that accumulate in shellfish, which are toxic to humans and animals if consumed. It was the first recorded outbreak of red tide on the Maine coast. Toxicity levels 100 times above safe thresholds were found. Governor Kenneth M. Curtis ordered the closure of the entirety of the Maine coast to shellfish harvesting.

In 1973, the Maine Legislature enacted the Maine Coastal Island Registry, which gave people 10 years to file claims with the state of ownership of ledges and islands with three or fewer structures, with unclaimed properties reverting to state ownership. Intended to bring clarity to ownership and discourage developers from staking claims of land with no recorded deeds, the law was sponsored by State Senator Joseph E. Brennan, who said, "In many ways the islands are like public lots—a valuable public asset that has been grossly underutilized because the state's legal rights have been unclear and even the exact location has been in doubt."

Naval shipyard Bath Iron Works undertook an expansion of Maine State Pier in Portland starting in 1981 for a ship overhaul and outfitting facility there, at an initial cost projection of $46.7 million with financing from the state of Maine and the city of Portland. BIW installed a dry dock in Portland with a lifting capacity of more than 24,000 tons, triple the capacity of its dry dock in Bath. BIW ran the Portland shipyard until 2001.

In August 1989, the Coast Guard converted Portland Head Light to automated operations. Petty officer Davis Simpson was the last to hold the position of head light keeper.

The oil tanker Julie N. struck the Million Dollar Bridge on September 27, 1996, breaching a tank. An estimated 180,000 gallons of home heating oil spilled into the Fore River estuary, with containment measures only partially successful.

In 1997, construction was completed on the Casco Bay Bridge over the Fore River as a replacement span for the Million Dollar Bridge connecting Portland and South Portland.

Operation was curtailed in 2016 of the Portland-Montreal petroleum pipeline, after 75 years of service.

A swimmer died in June 2020 after being bitten by a great white shark off Bailey Island, the first recorded fatality as the result of a shark attack in Casco Bay. A state official said the following day, "It's not something we ever would have considered in Maine waters."

Two powerful storm systems hit Maine's coastal counties three days apart in January 2024, with winds reaching hurricane force at points on the shore and islands, and flooding prompting the rescue of dozens of people in Cumberland and York counties from homes and vehicles. The storms caused an estimated $70 million in damage in eight coastal Maine counties. The storm caused extensive damage to boats, buildings, docks, piers and other coastal infrastructure throughout Casco Bay, including the destruction of Eagle Island's pier that closed the state historic site for the 2024 season. The fishing vessel Jacob Pike sank in shallow waters in the New Meadows River section of Casco Bay, and a fishing trawler went aground at Cape Elizabeth.

== Marine economy ==
A 2017 University of Southern Maine study commissioned by the Casco Bay Estuary Partnership estimated that the Casco Bay region's "ocean economy" supported $704 million in annual economic activity and 18,500 jobs, 70% of the spending linked to recreation.

South Portland's seven petroleum terminals have storage capacity for 8.6 million barrels of oil, with half the state of Maine's home heating oil arriving through the Port of Portland.

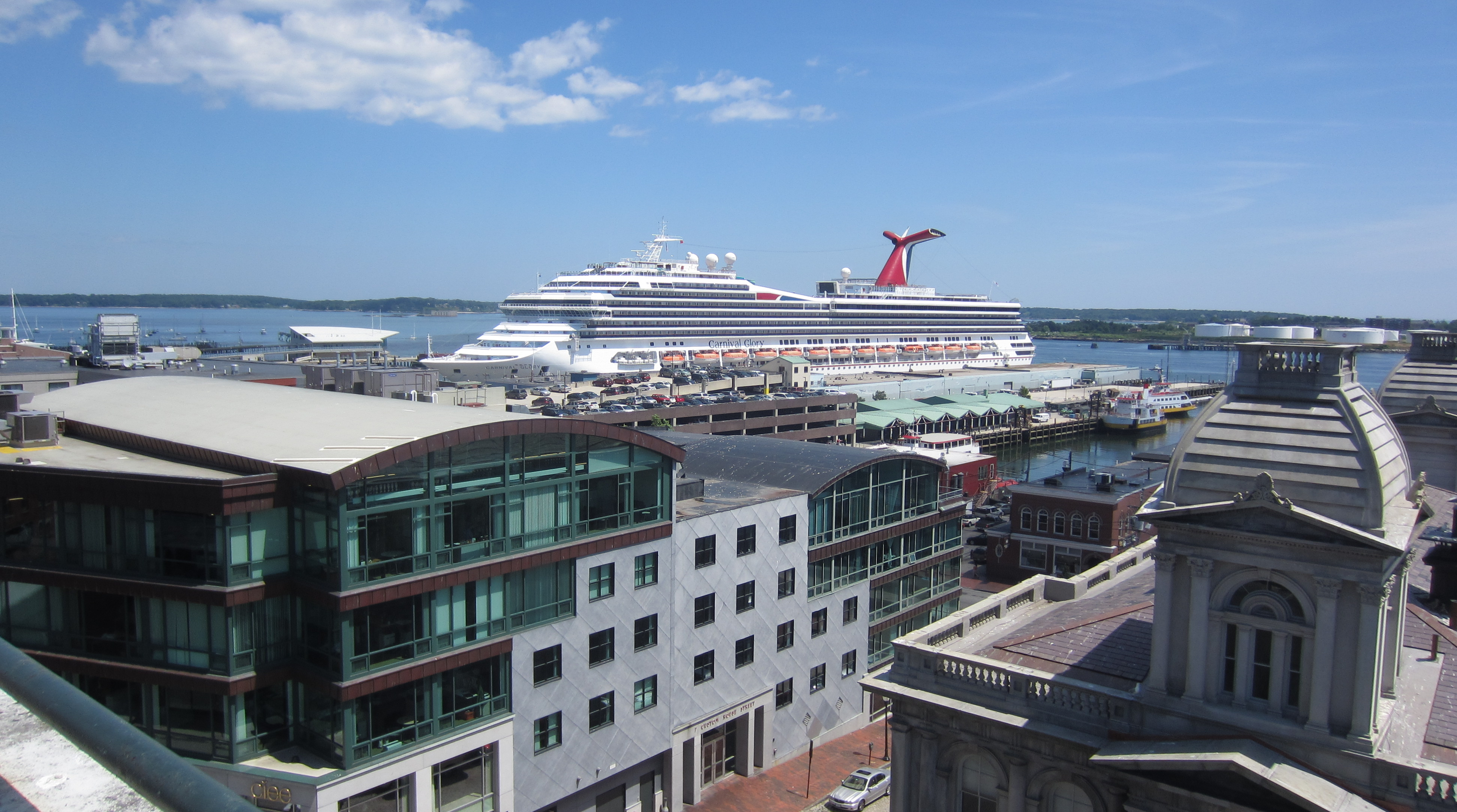
The cruise ship Carnival Glory docked in 2013 at Maine State Pier in Portland, Maine.

In October 2011, Portland completed $27 million in upgrades at Ocean Gateway International Marine Passenger Terminal that allowed for operators of large cruise ships to add the city to their ports of call. Cruise Maine reported 133 cruise ship calls and just over 200,000 passenger days in Portland for 2024, a slight decrease in visitations from 2023.

Cumberland County lobster harvesters trapped about 10.4 million pounds of lobsters in 2025, at a market value of about $67.9 million. Dating back two decades, 2016 was the peak harvest year with nearly 14.4 million pounds of lobster landed by Cumberland County licensees, for $61.5 million in market value that year.

In addition to lobster harvesters, Portland is the home port for offshore fishing vessels that offload their catch primarily at the Portland Fish Exchange. In 2024, landings totaled about 13.8 million pounds of seafood at a market value of $26.7 million according to NOAA Fisheries, ranking Portland first among 33 Maine ports. Landings peaked in 1993 at 87.3 million pounds and $49.1 million in market value.

As of October 2024, the Maine Department of Marine Resources listed more than 50 active aquaculture site leases in Casco Bay managed by more than 30 operators, totaling about 220 acres for the nurture and harvest of oysters, clams, mussels, scallops and sugar kelp.

Portland Schooner Co. offers windjammer cruises on four historic schooners in its fleet in Bagheera and Wendameen built in Boothbay, Timberwind built in Portland, and Heart's Desire built in South Freeport; as well as the gaff-rigged sloop Vela. Cruises are available on the schooner Alert operating from Bailey Island in Harpswell.

The state of Maine listed 40 fishing charter boats operating in Cumberland County as of 2023.

Casco Bay marinas include:

- Chebeague Island Boat Yard on Chebeague Island
- Diamond's Edge Marine on Great Diamond Island
- Dolphin Marina and Safe Harbor Great Island in Harpswell
- Handy Boat Service in Falmouth
- DiMillo's Old Port Marina, Fore Points Marina, Maine Yacht Center and Portland Yacht Services in Portland
- Port Harbor Marine, South Port Marine, Spring Point Marina and Sunset Marina in South Portland
- Paul's Marina on Mere Point in Brunswick
- Peaks Island Marina on Peaks Island
- Brewer South Freeport Marine and Strouts Point Wharf Co. in Freeport
- Royal River Boat, Yankee Marina & Boatyard, and Yarmouth Boat Yard in Yarmouth
- New Meadows Marina in Brunswick.

Casco Bay municipalities hold annual tourist events linked to the bay, to include MS HarborFest in Portland and South Portland which includes the MS Harborfest Regatta, a tugboat muster and races, and the Portland Harbor installment of the Maine Lobster Boat Races, with the circuit having staged races off Harpswell and Long Island as well over the years. The city of Portland holds its annual independence day fireworks display at the Eastern Promenade, drawing spectators to other parts of the harbor shore and on boats in the harbor.

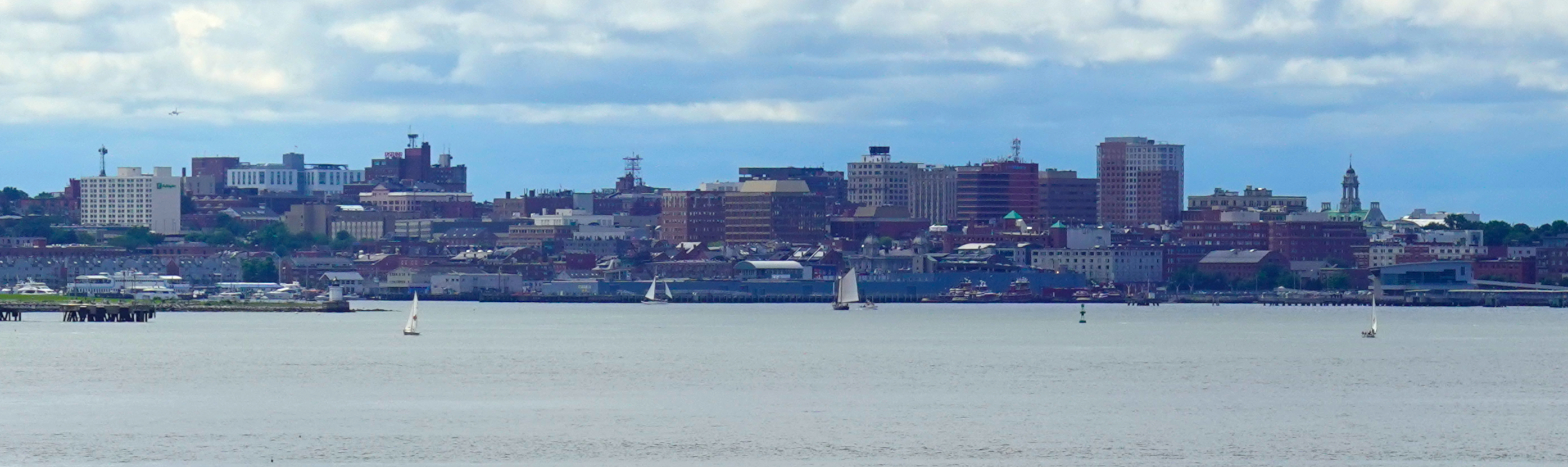
Portland Harbor in August 2023 as seen from Peaks Island in Casco Bay, Maine.

The Yarmouth Clam Festival has drawn an estimated 80,000 people over three days, with 2024 contest registrations logging attendees from more than 30 states and 13 countries.

Portland Harbor has been a port of call for multiple tall ship festivals, including OpSail 2000 and Tall Ships Portland in 2015.

== Transportation ==
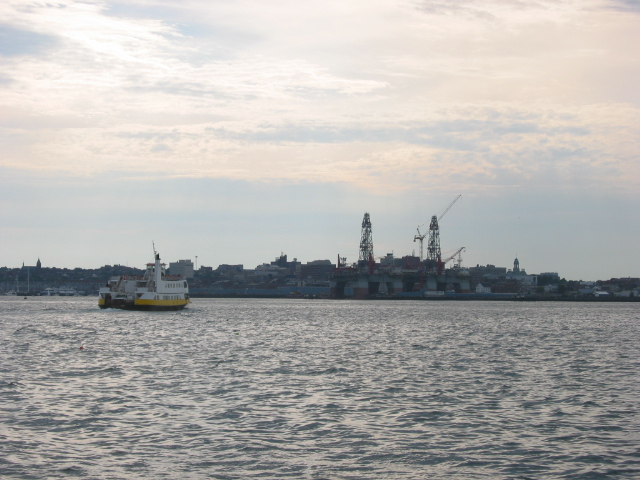
A Casco Bay Lines ferry returning to Portland after its journey out into the bay

Casco Bay Lines provides ferry service from the Maine State Pier in Portland to Peaks, Little Diamond, Great Diamond, Long, Great Chebeague and Cliff islands, along with specialty cruises on the bay for tourists. Casco Bay Lines also runs a vehicle ferry between Portland and Peaks Island. In 2022, Casco Bay Lines recorded more than 997,300 passenger boardings, a gain of more than 51,000 passenger trips from 2013.

The independent Chebeague Island Ferry provides service from Cousins Island, and Bustins Island operates a seasonal ferry to South Freeport.

Other Casco Bay services such as water taxis operate as alternatives to ferries, but are limited to six passengers per boat.

== Environmental conservation ==
The Gulf of Maine Research Institute has its headquarters at Union Wharf in Portland, thought to be the oldest commercial pier in Portland dating back to 1793. In 2024, the Gulf of Maine Research Institute released its inaugural Casco Bay Ecosystem Monitoring Report to track impacts on the environment over time.

As part of its "Casco Bay Plan 2024", the Casco Bay Estuary Partnership published an extensive inventory of existing initiatives by organizations to study the ecology of the bay and watershed; impacts of human activities historically on the environment; and "gap" analyses of areas where further research was needed.

In addition to the Casco Bay Estuary Partnership and Gulf of Maine Research Institute, other nonprofits and government entities that marshal resources toward rehabilitating, monitoring or protecting Casco Bay's natural environment include:

- Bowdoin College;
- Friends of Casco Bay;
- Maine Department of Environmental Protection;
- Maine Department of Marine Resources;
- Southern Maine Community College;
- National Oceanic and Atmospheric Administration;
- U.S. Environmental Protection Agency;
- U.S. Geological Survey;
- University of Maine;
- University of New Hampshire; and
- Wells National Estuarine Research Reserve.

As of 2024, about 15% of the Casco Bay watershed was protected under conservation areas. A number of land trusts protect portions of the Casco Bay shore and islands from development with the goal of maintaining their natural state, to include the:

- Brunswick-Topsham Land Trust;
- Cape Elizabeth Land Trust;
- Chebeague & Cumberland Land Trust;
- Eastern Trail Alliance;
- Falmouth Land Trust;
- Freeport Conservation Trust;
- Great Diamond Island Land Preserve;
- Harpswell Heritage Land Trust;
- Maine Coast Heritage Trust;
- Maine Island Trail Association;
- Oceanside Conservation Trust of Casco Bay;
- Peaks Island Land Preserve;
- Portland Trails;
- Royal River Conservation Trust; and
- South Portland Land Trust.

In 2002, the Maine Coast Heritage Trust purchased Whaleboat Island, to preserve it from future development while allowing public access and camping. At 122 acres, Whaleboat is the largest undeveloped island in Casco Bay.

The Maine Department of Agriculture, Conservation and Forestry includes a section of Casco Bay in its Focus Areas of Statewide Ecological Significance program. The Maquoit and Middle Bay Focus Area extends roughly from Princes Point and Cousins Island in Yarmouth to Harpswell, including the intervening shoreline and a number of islands.

In 2020, Bowdoin College completed construction of its expanded Schiller Coastal Studies Center on Orr's Island, including a lab and four residential buildings for students.

Under a Casco Bay Estuary Partnership initiative, in 2022 a University of Massachusetts-Dartmouth team created a high-resolution ocean model of Casco Bay, which logs daily conditions and forecasts including ocean height, wave states, temperatures and salinity.

In 2023, Friends of Casco Bay and Bigelow Center for Ocean Sciences launched an extended study to determine PFAS levels in Casco Bay.

To reduce wastewater pollution in Casco Bay, the City of Portland completed construction in 2025 of an expanded system of underground storage tanks along Back Cove to hold runoff stormwater and wastewater during heavy rains, until the water can be treated before release into the bay. The new tanks can hold 3.5 million gallons of excess water, preventing combined sewer overflows that occurred during heavy rains previously. In 2022 alone, an estimated 166.5 million gallons of combined sewer effluent entered Casco Bay from 64 overflow events.

In January 2025, the Maine Natural Resources Conservation Program awarded Yarmouth a $1 million grant toward the cost of removing the Bridge Street dam of the Royal River to restore the river's natural flow into Casco Bay. As of 2026, fundraising was continuing toward the cost of removing two more dams impeding the river's flow.

With sediments having accumulated for decades on the floor of Portland Harbor that could in time limit pier access by deeper-draft vessels, dredging began in December 2025 near piers. With federal rules prohibiting the disposal of contaminated sediments at sea, the Portland Board of Harbor Commissioners secured state and federal funding to create a "confined aquatic disposal" area in Portland Harbor. The CAD site was dredged deep to take sediments from other parts of the harbor, with plans to cap it with layers of sand to keep any contaminated sediments contained.

== Islands ==
Major islands

- Bailey Island
- Bustins Island
- Cliff Island
- Cousins Island
- Cushing Island
- Great Chebeague Island
- Great Diamond Island
- Long Island
- Mackworth Island
- Orr's Island
- Peaks Island
- Sebascodegan Island

Minor islands

- Bangs Island
- Basket Island
- Barnes Island
- Bartol Island
- Basin Island
- Bates Island
- Bear Island
- Ben Island
- Big Hen Island
- Birch Island
- Bombazine Island
- Bowman Island
- Bragdon Island
- Broken Cove
- The Brothers
- Burnt Coat Island
- Bush Island
- Bushy Islet
- Center Island
- Clapboard Island
- College Island
- Cow Island
- Crab Island
- Crow Island, Town of Chebeague Island
- Crow Island, Middle Bay
- Crow Island, Hussey Sound
- Crow Island, Chandler Cove
- Dingley Island
- Doughty Island
- Eagle Island
- East Brown Cow Island
- East Gosling Island
- Elm Islands
- Flash Island
- French Island
- Gallows Island
- George Island
- Gooseberry Island
- Goose Nest Island
- Great Mark Island
- Halfway Rock
- Harbor Island
- Haskell Island
- Hen Island
- Hen Islet
- Hog Island
- Hope Island
- Horse Island
- Hopkins Island
- House Island
- Inner Green Island
- Irony Island
- Jaquish Island
- Jenny Island
- Jenny's Nubble
- Jewell Island
- Junk of Pork
- Lanes Island
- Leavitt Island
- Little Birch Island
- Little Bustins Island
- Little Chebeague Island
- Little Diamond Island
- Little Flying Point Island
- Little French Island
- Little Iron Island
- Little Island
- Little Jewell Island
- Little Mark Island
- Little Moshier Island
- Little Snow Island
- Little Whaleboat Island
- Little Wood Island
- Little Yarmouth Island
- Littlejohn Island
- Long Island, Harpswell
- Long Point Island
- Lower Coombs Island
- Lower Goose Island
- Malaga Island
- Mark Island
- Merritt Island
- Ministerial Island
- Moshier Island
- Mouse Island
- The Nubbin
- Oak Island
- Outer Green Island
- Overset Island
- Pettingill Island
- Pinkham Island
- Pole Island
- Pond Island
- Pound of Tea
- Pumpkin Nob
- Ragged Island
- Ram Island, Harpswell
- Ram Island, Portland
- Raspberry Island
- Rogue Island
- Rogues Island
- Sand Island
- Scrag Island
- Sheep Island
- Shelter Island
- Sister Island
- Snow Island
- Sow and Pigs
- Stave Island
- Stockman Island
- Strawberry Creek Island
- Sturdivant Island
- Three Islands
- Turnip Island
- Two Bush Island
- Uncle Zeke Island
- Upper Coombs Island
- Upper Flag Island
- Upper Goose Island
- Upper Green Island
- Vaill Island
- West Brown Cow
- West Gosling Island
- Whaleboat Island
- White Island
- White Bull Island
- Williams Island
- Wood Island
- Wyer Island
- Yarmouth Island

== Lighthouses ==
Casco Bay is home to six lighthouses:

- Cape Elizabeth Lights
- Portland Head Light
- Ram Island Ledge Light
- Spring Point Ledge Light
- Portland Breakwater (Bug) Light
- Halfway Rock Light

== Forts ==
Forts in Casco Bay:

Fort	Constructed	Location
Fort Gorges	1865	Hog Island Ledge, Portland
Fort Levett	1898	Cushing Island, Portland
Fort Lyon	1896	Cow Island, Portland
Fort McKinley	1897	Great Diamond Island, Portland
Fort Preble	1808	Southern Maine Community College/Spring Point Ledge Light, South Portland
Fort Scammel	1808	
Fort Williams	1873	Fort Williams Park, Cape Elizabeth
Battery Steele	1942	Peaks Island, Portland

== National Register of Historic Places inclusions on Casco Bay islands and shoreline ==
Site	Constructed	Location
Bailey Island Bridge	1828	Harpswell
U.S. Custom House	1868	Portland
Eighth Maine Regiment Memorial	1891	Peaks Island, Portland
Bailey Island Library Hall	1912	Harpswell
Harraseeket Historic District		Freeport
Auburn–Harpswell Association Historic District		Harpswell
Baxter Summer Home	1917	Mackworth Island, Falmouth
Beckett's Castle	1871	Cape Elizabeth
C.A. Brown Cottage	1886	Cape Elizabeth
Cousins Island Chapel	1894	Cousins Island, Yarmouth
Deacon Andrew Dunning House	1757	Harpswell
Eagle Island	1904	Eagle Island, Harpswell
East Harpswell Free Will Baptist Church	1843	Sebascodegan Island, Harpswell
Great Chebeague Golf Club		Chebeague Island
Greene Cottage	1913	Harpswell
Halfway Rock Light	1871	Halfway Rock
Little Mark Island Monument	1827	Little Mark Island
Merriconegan Farm	1830	Harpswell
Norton House Historic District	1912	Falmouth
Orr's Island Meeting House	1855	Orr's Island, Harpswell
Payson House at Thornhurst	1852	Falmouth
Pennellville Historic District		Brunswick
Pettengill House and Farm	circa 1800	Freeport
Portland Breakwater Light	1855	South Portland
Portland Head Light	1791	Cape Elizabeth
Capt. Greenfield Pote House	1760	Freeport
Ram Island Ledge Light	1905	Ram Island Ledge
Spring Point Ledge Light	1897	South Portland
Cape Elizabeth Light	1828	Cape Elizabeth
Union Hotel	1862	Sebascodegan Island, Harpswell
Back Cove		Portland
Bagheera	1923	Portland
Battery Steele	1942	Peaks Island, Portland
Eastern Promenade		Portland
Fifth Maine Regiment Community Center"	1888	Peaks Island, Portland
Fort Gorges	1864	Hog Island Ledge, Portland
Fort McKinley		Great Diamond Island, Portland
Fort McKinley Torpedo Storehouse	1908	Great Diamond Island, Portland
Greenwood Garden Playhouse	1884	Peaks Island, Portland
United States Marine Hospital	1855	Portland
Mariner's Church	1828	Portland
Old Port		Portland
John B. Russwurm House	circa 1810	Portland
Stroudwater Historic District		Portland
Tate House	1755	Portland
Timberwind	1931	Portland
Trefethen-Evergreen Improvement Association	1914	Peaks Island, Portland
Wendameen	1912	Portland
Malaga Island		Phippsburg

== In arts and popular culture ==
- Poet Henry Wadsworth Longfellow drew inspiration for his 1850 collection The Seaside and the Fireside from his native Portland and Casco Bay. The collection included the poem "The Building of the Ship" which Longfellow used as an allegory for strengthening the "ship of state" in national affairs.
- Edward Hopper painted multiple scenes of the Casco Bay coast, including Portland Head Light in Lighthouse and Buildings, Portland Head, Cape Elizabeth, Maine in 1927; and Cape Elizabeth Light in Lighthouse Hill and Light at Two Lights that same year, and The Lighthouse at Two Lights in 1929.
- For the 1939 New York World's Fair, Portland artist Victor Kahill was commissioned to design a sculpture to commemorate the Maine fishing industry. Kahill produced a plaster mold for The Maine Lobsterman, with three statues cast from the mold on display at Land's End on Bailey Island, in downtown Portland, and in Washington, D.C.
- The Edna St. Vincent Millay poem Ragged Island was published in 1954, four years after her death. Millay and spouse Eugen Jan Boissevain bought Ragged Island in 1933 as a summer retreat.
- The Whales of August, released in October 1987 as one of Bette Davis's last films, was shot largely on Cliff Island over eight weeks in the autumn of 1986.
- Producers of the 1998 film Snow Falling on Cedars shot scenes at Portland Head Light during a January ice storm that year that caused extensive damage in Maine.
- In 2008, composers Peter J. McLaughlin and Akiva G. Zamcheck wrote a piece in four movements paying homage to the wreck of the Don, lost near Ragged Island on June 29, 1941. The piece received critical acclaim from the Portland Press Herald and from fellow Maine composers.
- The 2019 feature film Blow the Man Down was shot on location in Harpswell, including scenes on Orr's Island and at the Cribstone Bridge and Cundy's Harbor.

== Media ==
The National Trust for Local News acquired the Portland Press Herald and the Maine Sunday Telegram in 2023, establishing the Maine Trust for Local News to oversee the newspapers which frequently report on Casco Bay's environment and developments. Both newspapers trace their history to the 1862 establishment of the Portland Daily Press and the 1803 start of the Eastern Argus which was later absorbed by The Portland Herald. An affiliated newspaper called The Evening Express ran until 1991 when it was discontinued by Guy Gannett Publishing Co., which owned all three newspapers at the time. The Maine Trust for Local News also publishes The Forecaster line of weekly newspapers that cover municipalities along Casco Bay, and the weekly South Portland Sentry.

Television and radio broadcaster Maine Public operates a Portland studio and affiliated website that reports frequently on news and issues affecting Casco Bay and its waterfront communities. Other TV stations that report on Casco Bay issues include Hearst Television affiliate WMTW, Sinclair Broadcasting's WGME-TV, Tegna's WCSH and Cunningham Broadcasting's WPFO Fox 23.

Founded in 1983 and based in Rockland, the Island Institute publishes The Working Waterfront monthly which reports on the marine economy and environmental issues statewide, including in Casco Bay.

New England Business Media launched the bi-weekly print publication MaineBiz in 1994, which includes Casco Bay developments and issues in its reporting.

The nonprofit Harpswell Anchor publishes a monthly newspaper that includes news on Bailey and Orr's islands.

The Casco Bay Weekly ran from 1988 to 2004. The Breeze Publishing Co. ran Casco Bay Breeze from 1901 to 1917, weekly during the summer and monthly the rest of the year.

== Notable people ==
- Walter Bagnall, settler
- Joshua Chamberlain, governor and military officer
- George Cleeve, settler
- John Cousins, settler
- Lemuel Cushing, entrepreneur
- David Dodd, economist
- Elijah Kellogg, author
- George Baker Leavitt Sr., ship captain
- Christopher Levett, explorer
- James Lane, settler
- Edna St. Vincent Millay, poet
- Dodge Morgan, sailor and entrepreneur
- Thomas Moser, furniture designer
- Henry Mowat, naval officer
- George Munjoy, settler
- John A. Poor, railroad developer
- Thomas Purchase, settler
- Robert Peary, explorer
- Edward Preble, naval officer
- Jedidiah Preble, military officer
- William Royall, settler
- Harriet Beecher Stowe, author
- Hannah Swarton, settler
- Edward Tyng, military officer
- Edward Tyng, naval officer
- Thomas Westbrook, military officer

== See also ==
- List of islands of Maine
- Casco, Wisconsin, named after Casco Bay
