= Fort Levett =

Former United States Army Fort

- Part of Harbor Defenses of Portland
- Cushing Island, Maine
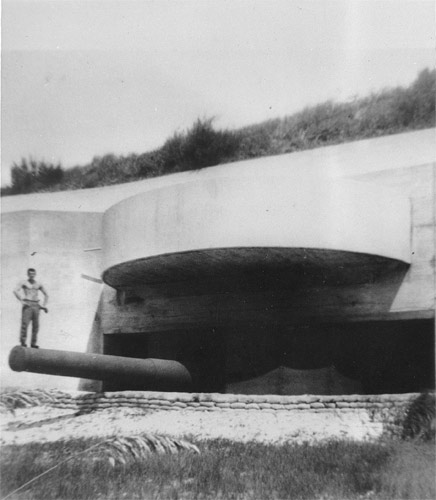
- 12-inch casemated gun, similar to those at Battery Foote, Fort Levett

Site information
- Type: Coastal defense
- Owner: private
- Controlled by: private
- Open to the public: no

Location
- Location in Maine
- Coordinates: 43°38′35″N 70°11′43″W

Site history
- Built: 1898
- Built by: United States Army
- In use: 1898-1948
- Battles/wars: World War I World War II

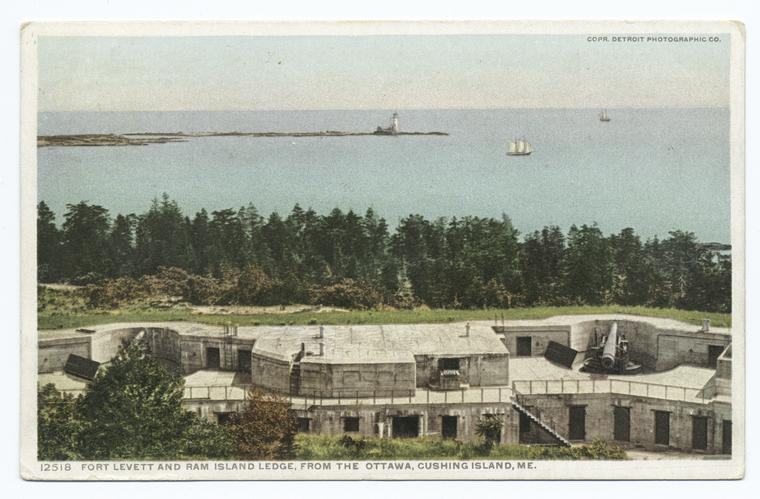
1909 view of two 12-inch disappearing guns of Battery Bowdoin and Ram Island Ledge.

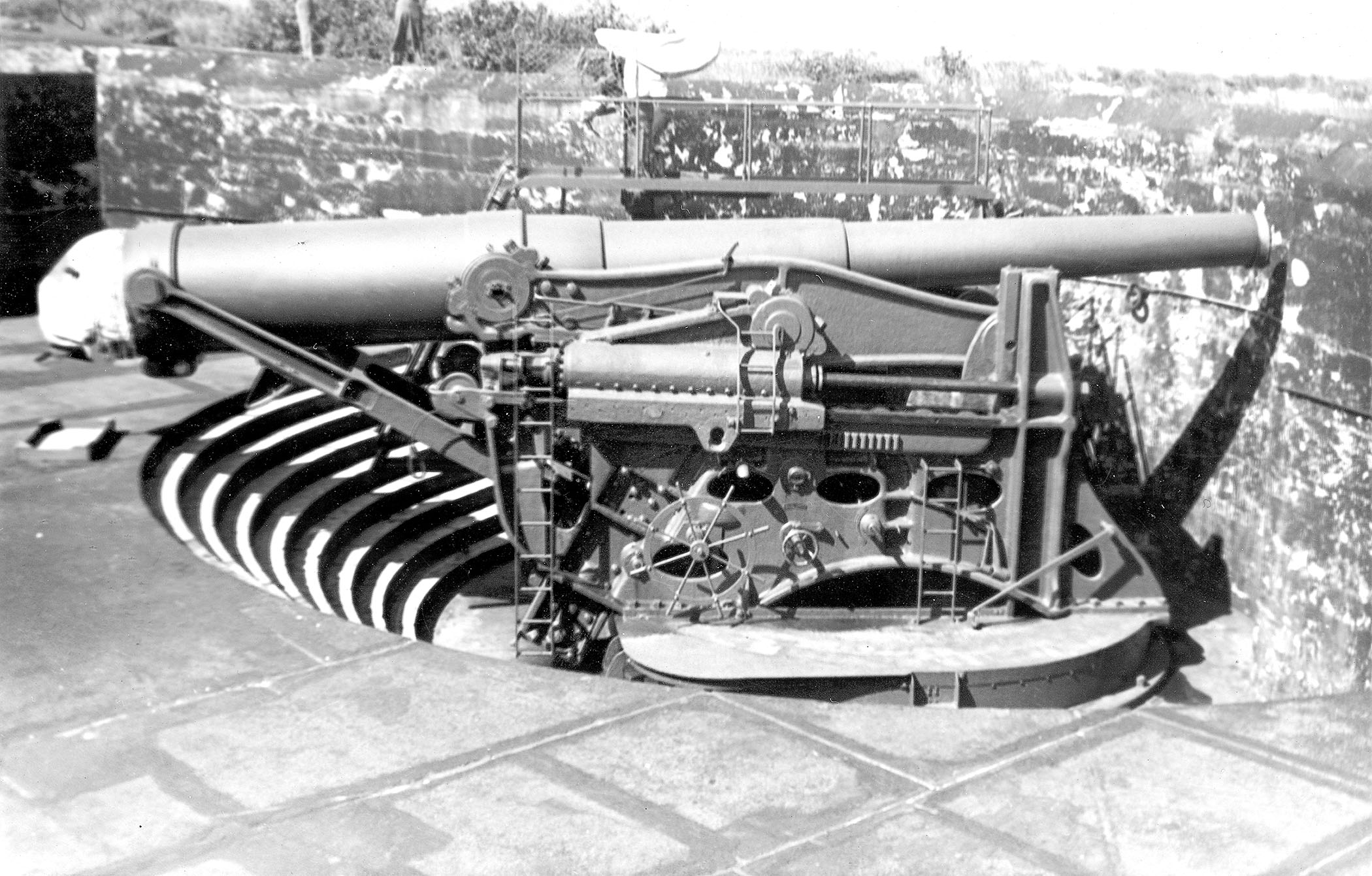
12-inch disappearing gun, similar to those at Fort Levett.

Fort Levett was a former U.S. Army fort built on Cushing Island, Maine, beginning in 1898. Located in Cumberland County, Maine, in Casco Bay near Portland, Maine, the fort was heavily fortified with guns for coastal defense. Conceived under the Endicott Program in 1885 and begun in the wake of the Spanish–American War, Fort Levett was manned during both world wars. It was part of the Coast Defenses of Portland, later renamed the Harbor Defenses of Portland, a command which protected Portland's port and naval anchorage from 1904 to 1950. The fort's name is sometimes misspelled "Leavitt".

== History ==
Fort Levett was built on 140 acres (0.57 km^{2}) of Cushing Island, and the coast artillery fortification was visited by several Secretaries of War, including Jacob M. Dickinson in 1909. The fort, whose call letters were FV, was part of a network of forts guarding Portland Harbor and Casco Bay under the Coast Defenses of Portland (Harbor Defenses after 1925), which included Levett, Fort Williams on Portland Head, and Fort McKinley on Great Diamond Island as well as Fort Preble. Fort Scammel and Fort Gorges, once strongly fortified and guarding the harbor entrance, were decommissioned earlier than the previous three forts, and were not modernized after the 1870s. The forts were built by the United States Army Corps of Engineers, maintained by the Army's Ordnance Department, and after 1907 were manned by the United States Army Coast Artillery Corps.

=== Namesake ===
Fort Levett was named for English explorer Captain Christopher Levett, an early explorer of the New England coast and the first European to settle what is today Portland, Maine. King Charles I of England granted Levett 6,000 acres (24 km^{2}) to found a city the explorer proposed to call York, after his English birthplace. Levett founded a plantation in 1623, leaving a group of Yorkshiremen and women behind, and he returned to England. The settlement subsequently failed, and the colonists were never heard from again. Levett never returned to Maine.

=== Construction and armament ===
Fort Levett's construction began in 1898 (on land acquired in 1894) and was largely completed in 1903. The fort initially comprised five batteries. Battery Bowdoin was named for James Bowdoin, former governor of Massachusetts (which included Maine in his day), and had three 12-inch M1895 disappearing guns. Battery Kendrick was named for Henry Lane Kendrick, an Army officer and professor at West Point, and had two 10-inch M1895 disappearing guns. Battery Ferguson was named for Major William Ferguson, killed in action against Native Americans in 1791, was completed in 1906, and had two 6-inch M1900 guns on pedestal mounts. Battery Daniels was named for Lieutenant Napoleon Daniels, killed in action against Native Americans at Crazy Woman's Fork in 1866, and had two 3-inch M1898 guns (also called 15-pounder guns) on retractable masking parapet mounts. The fort also briefly had several 6-pounder rapid-fire guns on field mounts.

In addition to its artillery, the fort also operated as a wireless telegraph station. In order to furnish its base with water, the army dug four wells on Cushing Island. The island presented other challenges as well. In full view of the battery of artillery was a large summer hotel. "This hotel", noted a War Department report, "is so near that the guns can not be fired without causing much damage to the building. The occupants of this hotel, if it is allowed to remain there, will be practically in the fort, while the soldiers who garrison the fort will live in barracks at a considerable distance from their guns." Although the owners of the hotel wished the army to purchase it to billet its men, the army resisted the offer, and chose instead to erect its buildings nearby. The army subsequently erected cook tents and frame buildings at the fort. The fort had a base field hospital for the soldiers. All of the initial post buildings were completed by 1905. The fort was a sub-post of Fort Williams, and by 1910 was in caretaker status, with only a small garrison for maintenance, as there was no immediate threat to the area.

=== World War I ===
In 1915, with World War I raging in Europe and with rapidly improving dreadnought battleships providing an increased threat, the Board of Review recommended that Fort Levett receive a new, modernized battery as part of a program to increase the range of coastal forts. The battery was named Battery Foote in 1919, after Colonel Stephen Miller Foote, a Coast Artillery officer who died that year. Battery Foote had two 12-inch M1895 guns on new, high-angle M1917 barbette carriages for increased range and was completed in 1920. This type of battery was initially built in the open, relying on camouflage for concealment, and was incredibly vulnerable to air attack, as were the older disappearing batteries. The two 10-inch guns of Battery Kendrick were ordered dismounted as part of a railway artillery program in 1917, but were not shipped out and were soon remounted.

Fort Levett was operationally manned during the war, but probably not until the American entry into World War I in 1917. After World War I the two 3-inch guns of Battery Daniels were removed as part of a decommissioning of several types of guns. At some point between the wars the fort reverted to caretaker status.

=== World War II ===
In June 1939 a quartermaster survey showed that most of the 28 buildings at Fort Levett were in "poor" or "uninhabitable" condition. In June 1940 the post was in similar condition and still in caretaker status, but things were about to change. Shortly after the Fall of France in mid-1940 the United States manned its coast defenses, activated the National Guard, and developed a coast defense modernization program that was partially implemented during the war. During World War II the Harbor Defenses of Portland were garrisoned by the 8th Coast Artillery Regiment of the Regular Army and the 240th Coast Artillery Regiment of the Maine National Guard until late 1944, when the Coast Artillery was reorganized and reduced in strength. At Fort Levett, by June 1941 the older buildings had been rehabilitated and 26 temporary buildings had been added or planned, increasing the fort's capacity from 124 to 758 men. The basis of the World War II modernization program was to add new 16-inch gun batteries, retain long-range 12-inch batteries such as Battery Foote, and also add new long-range 6-inch gun and 90 mm gun batteries. The disappearing gun batteries that had served for 25–45 years would be scrapped. The 16-inch battery that anchored the Harbor Defenses of Portland was Battery Steele on Peaks Island. Battery Foote was casemated against air attack during the war, and a four-gun 90 mm Anti-Motor Torpedo Boat (AMTB) battery designated AMTB 962 was added. The other batteries of Fort Levett were scrapped by 1943 except the two 6-inch guns of Battery Ferguson, which were retained until after the war.

=== Postwar ===
With the end of World War II in 1945 all US coast defense guns were scrapped by 1948, and subsequently the obsolete Fort Levett was sold by the government, which asked $177,000 for the property. It was bought by a group of Cushing Island residents in 1957. In 1970 the main barracks building was razed, and the remaining structures were restored. Forts Levett and McKinley ultimately became private condominium associations.

== See also ==
- Casco Bay
- Port of Portland (Maine)
- Seacoast defense in the United States
- United States Army Coast Artillery Corps
- List of coastal fortifications of the United States
