= Stephen Miller Foote =

United States Army general

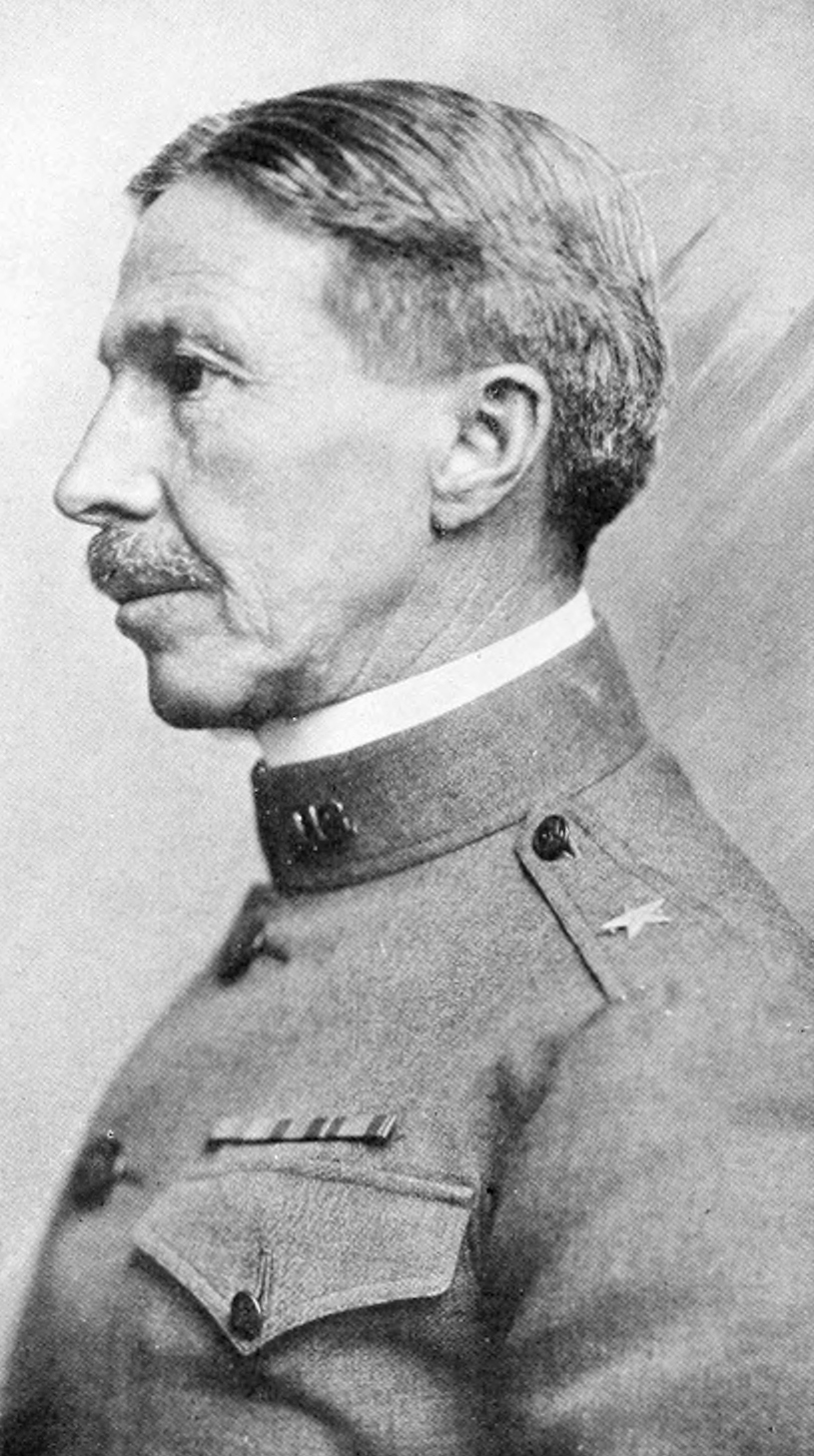
- From 1919's The 88th Division in the World War of 1914-1918
- Born: February 19, 1859; La Salle Township, Michigan
- Died: October 30, 1919 (aged 60); Fort Banks, Massachusetts, U.S.
- Burial place: Arlington National Cemetery
- Spouse: Sara Brooke (m. 1889)
- Children: 2
- Military career
- Allegiance: United States
- Branch: United States Army
- Service years: 1884–1919
- Rank: Brigadier general
- Units: U.S. Army Coast Artillery Corps; U.S. Army Field Artillery Branch
- Commands: Battery N, 6th Field Artillery Regiment; 70th Coast Artillery Company; Field Artillery Battalion, Fort Douglas; Jackson Barracks, Louisiana; Coast Artillery District of New Orleans; Coast Artillery District of the Columbia; Coast Artillery District of Baltimore; Coastal Defenses of San Francisco; Pacific Coast Artillery District; South Atlantic Coast Artillery District; U.S. Army Coast Artillery School; 163rd Field Artillery Brigade; 158th Depot Brigade; Coastal Defenses of Boston
- Wars: Spanish–American War • Siege of Santiago; Philippine–American War; World War I • Meuse-Argonne Offensive

Stephen Miller Foote (February 19, 1859 – October 30, 1919) was a career officer in the United States Army during the late 19th and early 20th centuries. A veteran of the Spanish–American War, Philippine–American War, and World War I, he specialized in Coast Artillery and attained the rank of brigadier general.

A native of La Salle Township, Michigan, Foote was raised in Michigan and Vermont. He graduated from New Haven, Vermont's Beeman Academy, then attended Middlebury College while teaching school. In 1880, he received appointment to the United States Military Academy, from which he graduated in 1884. As an expert in harbor defenses, an important strategic consideration beginning in the 1880s, Foote served on both the east and west coats of the United States. During the Spanish–American War, he served in Cuba, including participation in the Siege of Santiago. He was posted to the Philippines during the Philippine–American War, and commanded a field artillery battery that was later reorganized as a coast artillery company.

As Foote continued to advance through the ranks, he commanded an artillery battalion and several coast artillery districts. In 1913, he graduated from the United States Army War College. During the First World War, he commanded the 163rd Field Artillery Brigade, which included combat during the Meuse-Argonne Offensive. After the war, he commanded the 158th Depot Brigade as it demobilized soldiers returning to the United States, then was assigned to command the Coastal defenses of Boston. Foote became ill with appendicitis in October 1920. He died during surgery at Fort Banks and was buried at Arlington National Cemetery.

== Early life ==
Stephen Miller Foote was born in La Salle Township, Michigan on February 19, 1859, a son of William Henry Foote and Rebecca Dunlap (Miller) Foote. From the age of 14 he was raised in and around Middlebury, Vermont and he graduated from Beeman Academy in New Haven, Vermont. Foote taught school in Cornwall, Vermont and attended Middlebury College for two years.

In 1880, Foote was appointed to the United States Military Academy (West Point) by Congressman Charles Herbert Joyce. (Note: Foote was one of 137 applicants who took the competitive examination. 75 attained passing scores, and Foote was ranked first.) He graduated in 1884 ranked 10th of 37 and was commissioned as a second lieutenant in the 4th Artillery Regiment.

== Start of career ==
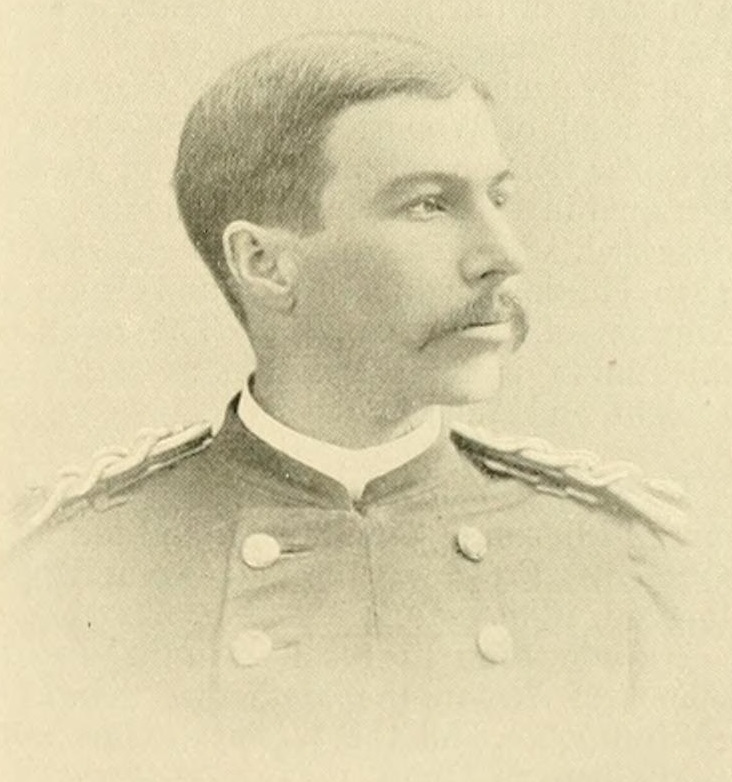
Foote as a first lieutenant in 1894.

Foote specialized in Coast Artillery for harbor defense, and was posted to Fort Adams, Rhode Island from September 1884 to September 1885. He was then assigned to the garrison at Fort Trumbull, Connecticut, where he remained until August 1886. Foote was next assigned as an assistant instructor of engineering at the Fort Monroe, Virginia Artillery School, where he served until March 1891. He was promoted to first lieutenant in June 1889. Foote served with the Intercontinental Railway Commission in Washington, D.C. and Central America from March 1891 to August 1892. (Note: The commission was an international effort to plan and construct a railroad through Guatemala, El Salvador, Nicaragua, and Costa Rica. The railway was first considered as a result of the First International Conference of American States. It was never completed, and its successor project was the Pan-American Highway.) He served with the 4th Artillery at Fort Barrancas, Florida from August 1892 to April 1893.

From April to October 1893, Foote was assigned to duty at the World's Columbian Exposition in Chicago. From October 1893 to September 1895, Foote served with his regiment, first at Fort McHenry, Maryland, then at Fort Adams. From September 1895 to September 1897, he was commandant of cadets at Vermont Academy. He served as commandant of cadets at New York Military Academy from September 1897 to April 1898. In 1897, Foote received the Gold Medal of the Military Service Institution of the United States; this annual prize was awarded for the best essay on a topic of current military interest. (Note: Articles were published anonymously, with the author's identity revealed after the competition. Winners were selected by secret ballot of the organization's executive council members. The title of Foote's essay was "Based on the Present Conditions, and Past Experiences, How Should our Volunteer Armies be Raised, Organized, Trained, and Mobilized for Future Wars?" In it, he proposed a system (ultimately not adopted) of mobilizing United States Volunteers that rejected the use of the National Guard for federal service.)

== Continued career ==
At the start of the Spanish–American War, Foote served with his regiment at Fort Mott, New Jersey from April to May 1898. From May to October, he served in Cuba as aide-de-camp to Major General Joseph Cabell Breckinridge Sr., the Inspector General of the United States Army, and took part in the Siege of Santiago. After the end of hostilities, he served at Chickamauga Park, Georgia and Camp Hamilton near Lexington, Kentucky. In October 1898 he was promoted to the brevet rank of captain in recognition of the superior service he rendered in Cuba. In November, he was promoted to temporary major of United States Volunteers.

Foote served at Macon, Georgia as acting judge advocate of First Army Corps from November 1898 to February 1899. He was then posted to Pinar del Río, Cuba during the United States Military Government in Cuba, where he remained until May 1899. He was promoted to permanent captain of the 6th Field Artillery Regiment in March 1899, and he was mustered out of the Volunteers in May.

From July to November 1899, Foote was posted to Fort McDowell on Angel Island, California, where he oversaw construction of a military detention camp. He then took command Battery N, 6th Field Artillery in Hawaii, which he led in the Philippines during the Philippine–American War. He continued in command after his battery was reorganized as the 70th Cast Artillery Company. Foote returned to the United States in December 1901, and was assigned to command the 4th Field Artillery Battery at Fort Myer, Virginia, where he was posted until March 1906.

Foote was promoted to major in February 1906. From March 1906 to June 1907, he commanded the Field Artillery Battalion based first at Fort Douglas, Utah and later at Fort D. A. Russell, Wyoming. From June 1907 to December 1909, he commanded the post at Jackson Barracks, Louisiana and the Coast Artillery District of New Orleans. He was promoted to lieutenant colonel of Coast Artillery in March 1909.

== Later career ==
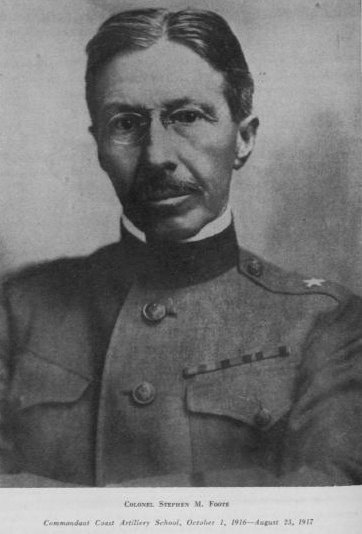
Foote as commandant of the Coast Artillery School in 1917

From January 1910 to August 1911, Foote served at Fort Stevens, Oregon as commander of the Coast Artillery District of the Columbia. He was then posted to Fort Howard, Maryland as commander of the Coast Artillery District of Baltimore, where he remained until January 1912. Foote was promoted to colonel of Coast Artillery in October 1911. From January to March 1912, Foote was a student in the Field Officers' Course at the Fort Leavenworth, Kansas Army Service Schools.

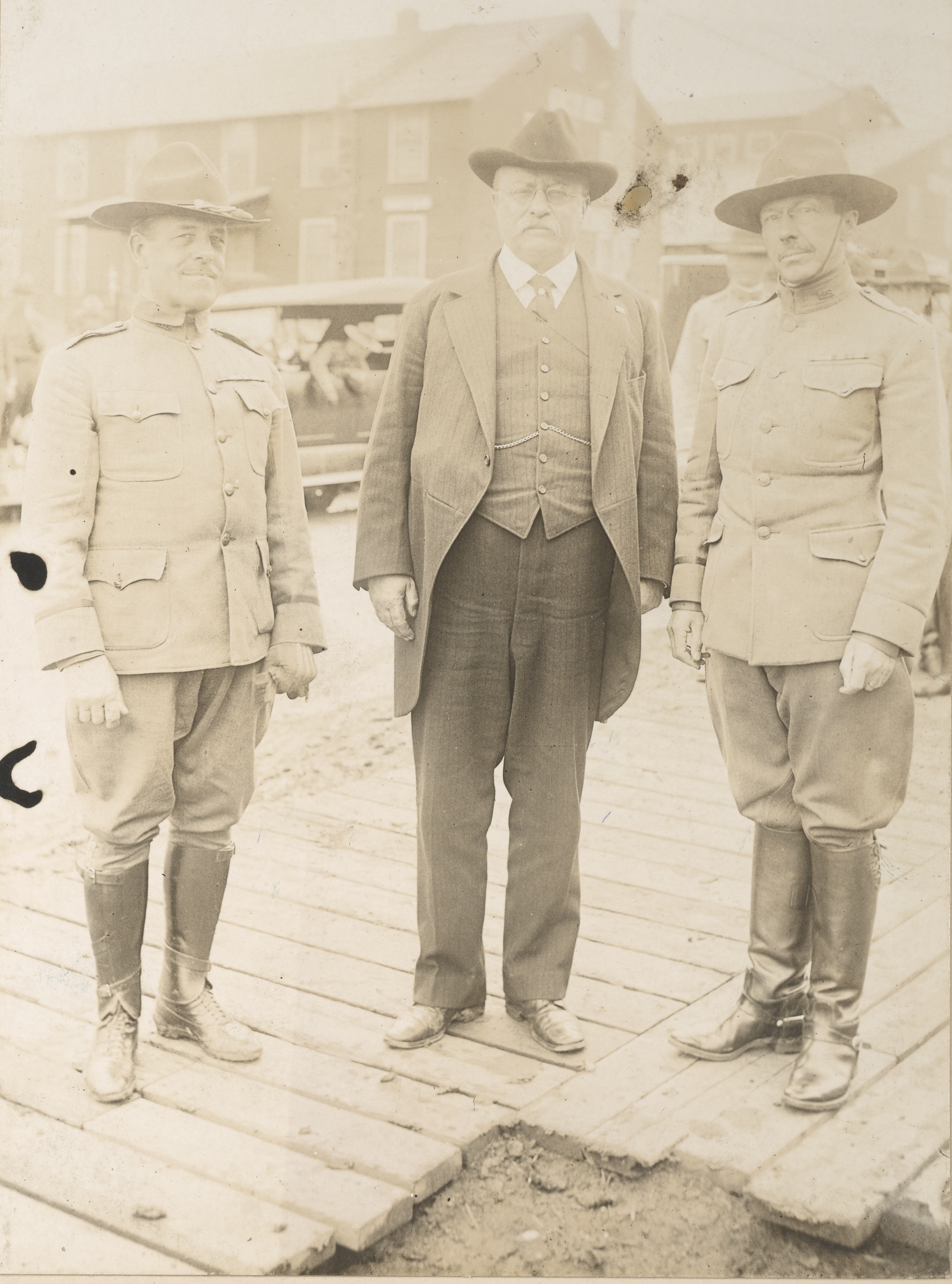
Theodore Roosevelt visits William D. Beach (left) and Stephen M. Foote (right), Camp Dodge, Iowa.

From May to August 1912, Foote served on the staff at the United States Department of War in Washington, D.C. He then attended the United States Army War College from September 1912 to June 1913. He performed temporary duty at the Naval War College in July and August 1913, after which he was assigned to the Army War College as an instructor. In July 1914, he was assigned to Fort Winfield Scott as commander of the Coastal Defenses of San Francisco. In October 1914 Foote was posted to Fort Miley as commander of the Pacific Coast Artillery District. In February 1915, he resumed command of the Coast Defenses of San Francisco. From October 1915 to August 1917, Foot served as commander of the South Atlantic Coast Artillery District and commandant of the Coast Artillery School ay Fort Monroe.

On August 5, 1917, Foote was promoted to temporary brigadier general and assigned to command the 163rd Field Artillery Brigade at Camp Dodge, Iowa. After the brigade was organized and trained, Foote led it during combat with the American Expeditionary Forces in France, including the Meuse–Argonne offensive. He continued in command after the Armistice of November 11, 1918, and led the brigade back to Camp Dodge in January 1919 so it could be mustered out. From March to May 1919, Foote commanded the 158th Depot Brigade at Camp Sherman, Ohio. He returned to the permanent rank of colonel in April 1919.

From May to October 1919, Foote commanded the Coast Defenses of Boston. He became ill with appendicitis in October, and died at Fort Banks, Massachusetts while undergoing surgery on October 30. He was buried at Arlington National Cemetery.

== Personal life ==
Foote married Sara Brooke on April 24, 1889. They were the parents of two daughters.

In June 1919, Middlebury College conferred on Foote the honorary degree of LL.D. In December 1919, the army announced that the 12th Long Range Coast Artillery Battery at Fort Levett, Maine would be named Battery Stephen M. Foote. In 1930, the U.S. Congress enacted legislation permitting the general officers of World War I to retire at their highest rank, and Foote's grade of brigadier general was posthumously restored.

== Works by ==
(Partial list)

- "Smaller Batteries For Field Artillery". Journal of the Military Service Institution of the United States. Governors Island, NY: Military Service Institution of the United States. July–August 1904. pp. 15–27 – via Google Books.
- "The Military Necessities Of The United States, And The Best Provisions For Meeting Them". Journal of the Military Service Institution of the United States. Governors Island, NY: Military Service Institution of the United States. September–October 1908. pp. 171–190 – via Google Books.
- "Military Service For College Men". Journal of the Military Service Institution of the United States. Governors Island, NY: Military Service Institution of the United States. November–December 1911. pp. 317–326 – via Google Books.
- "Outline Of A Plan For Effecting Universal Military Training In The United States". Journal of the Military Service Institution of the United States. Governors Island, NY: Military Service Institution of the United States. July–August 1917. pp. 3–16 – via Google Books.

== Bibliography ==
=== Books ===
- Davis, Henry Blaine Jr. (1998). Generals in Khaki. Raleigh, North Carolina: Pentland Press. ISBN 9781571970886. OCLC 40298151 – via Google Books.
- Foote, Abram William (1907). Foote Family: Comprising the Genealogy and History of Nathaniel Foote of Weathersfield, Conn. And His Descendants. Vol. I. Rutland, VT: Marble City Press‒The Tuttle Company – via Google Books.
- Marquis Who's Who (1975). Who Was Who In American History – The Military. Chicago, Illinois: Marquis Who's Who. ISBN 9780837932019. OCLC 2143230 – via Google Books.
- Middlebury College (1920). A Catalogue of Middlebury College. Norwood, MA: Plimpton Press – via Google Books.
- Zeigler, Sean M.; Evans, Alexandra; Gentile, Gian; Ahtchi, Badreddine (2020). The Evolution of U.S. Military Policy from the Constitution to the Present. Vol. II. Santa Monica, CA: Rand Corporation. ISBN 978-0-8330-9849-8 – via Google Books.

=== Newspapers ===
- "Competitive Examination". The Burlington Free Press. Burlington, VT. September 22, 1879 – via Newspapers.com.
- "137 Candidates". Middlebury Register. Middlebury, VT. July 2, 1880. p. 3 – via Newspapers.com.
- "Death Takes Col. Stephen M. Foote". The Boston Globe. Boston, MA. October 31, 1919 – via Newspapers.com.
- "The War Department has signally honored the memory of the late Brig. Gen. Stephen M. Foote". Middlebury Register. Middlebury, VT. December 4, 1919 – via Newspapers.com.

=== Internet ===
- Cullum, George W. (November 14, 2015). "Stephen Miller Foote In Biographical Register of the Officers and Graduates of the U.S. Military Academy, Volumes III–VI". Bill Thayer's Website. Chicago, IL: Bill Thayer.

=== Magazines ===
- Publication Committee (January 1895). "Prize Essay‒1895". Journal of the Military Service Institution of the United States. Governors island, NY: Military Service Institution of the United States – via Google Books.
- Publication Committee (September 1904). "Gold Medalists and Others to Whom Prizes have Been Awarded". Journal of the Military Service Institution of the United States. Governors island, NY: Military Service Institution of the United States – via Google Books.
- Rutkow, Eric (April 20, 2022). "Latin American History: The Pan American Highway". Oxford Research Encyclopedia. Oxford, England: Oxford University Press.
