= Harbor Defenses of Portland =

Coordinates: 43°38′55″N 70°13′35″W

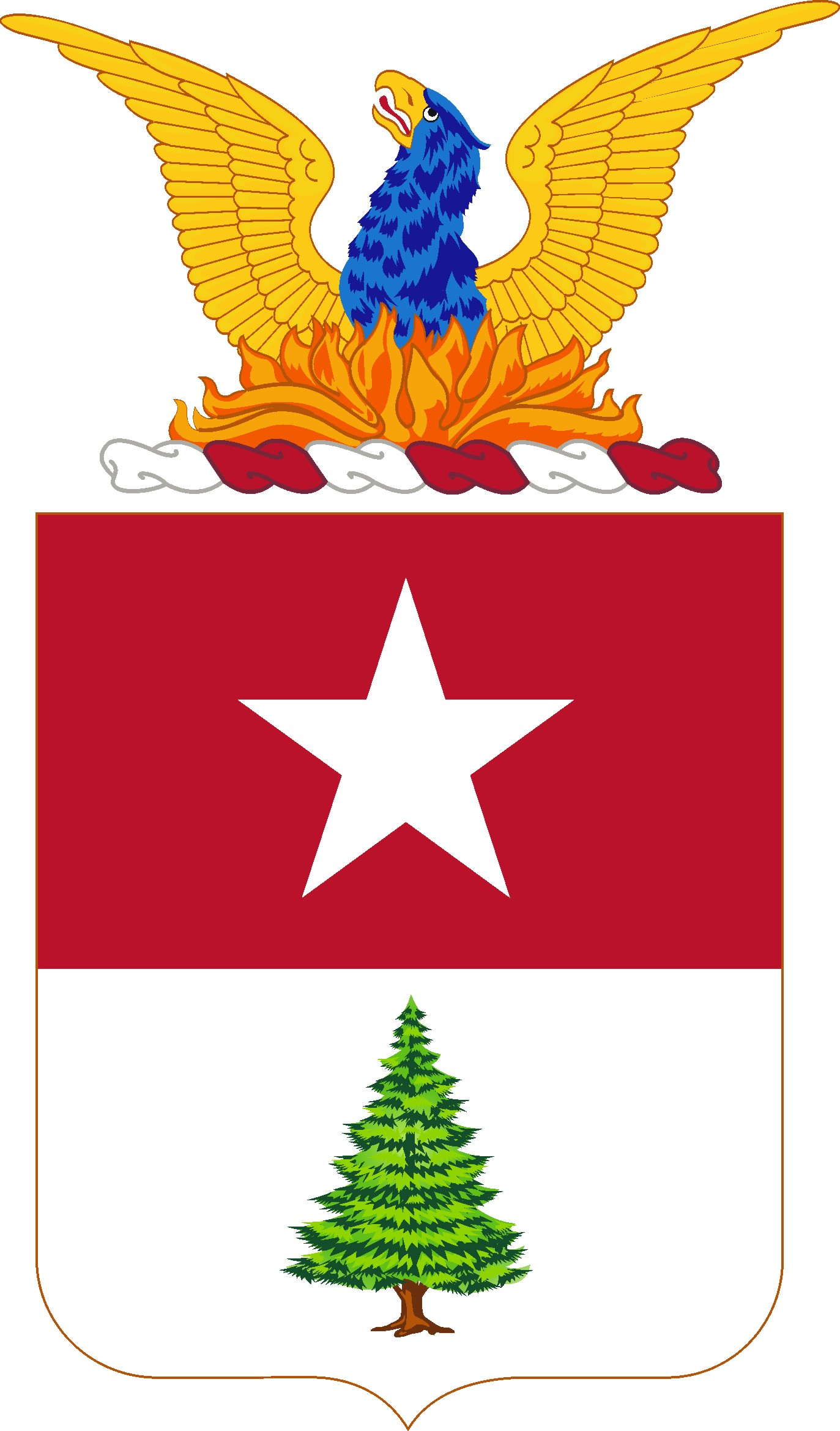
- Coat of arms
- Active: 1895-1950
- Country: United States
- Branch: United States Army Coast Artillery Corps
- Type: Coast artillery
- Role: Harbor Defense Command
- Part of: First Army 1933–1941; Eastern Defense Command 1941–1945
- Garrison/HQ: Fort Preble, South Portland, Maine; after 1940: Fort Williams, Cape Elizabeth, Maine
- Motto: Terrae Portam Defendamus (We Defend The Land Gate)
- Mascot: Oozlefinch

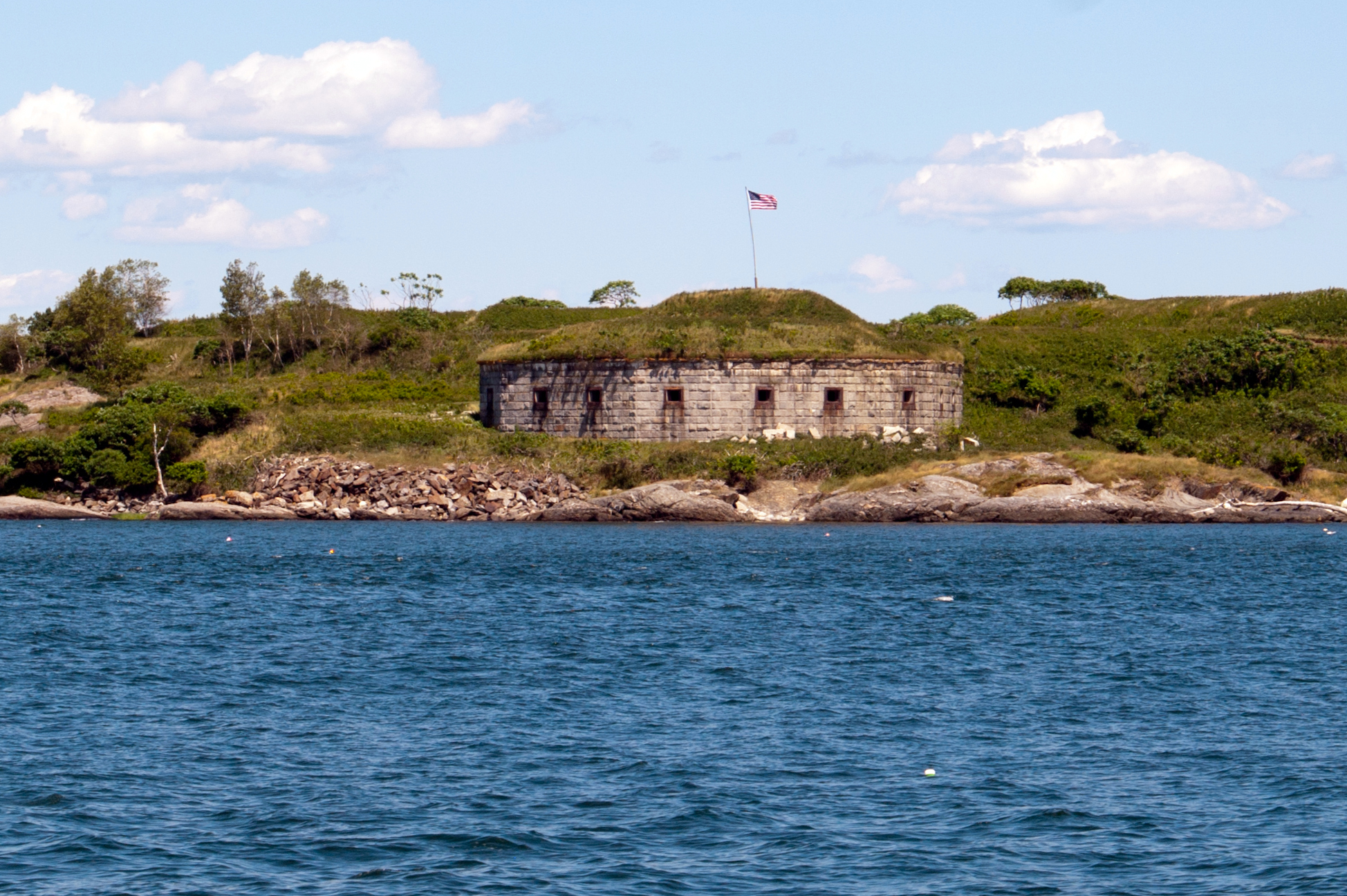
Part of Fort Scammell.

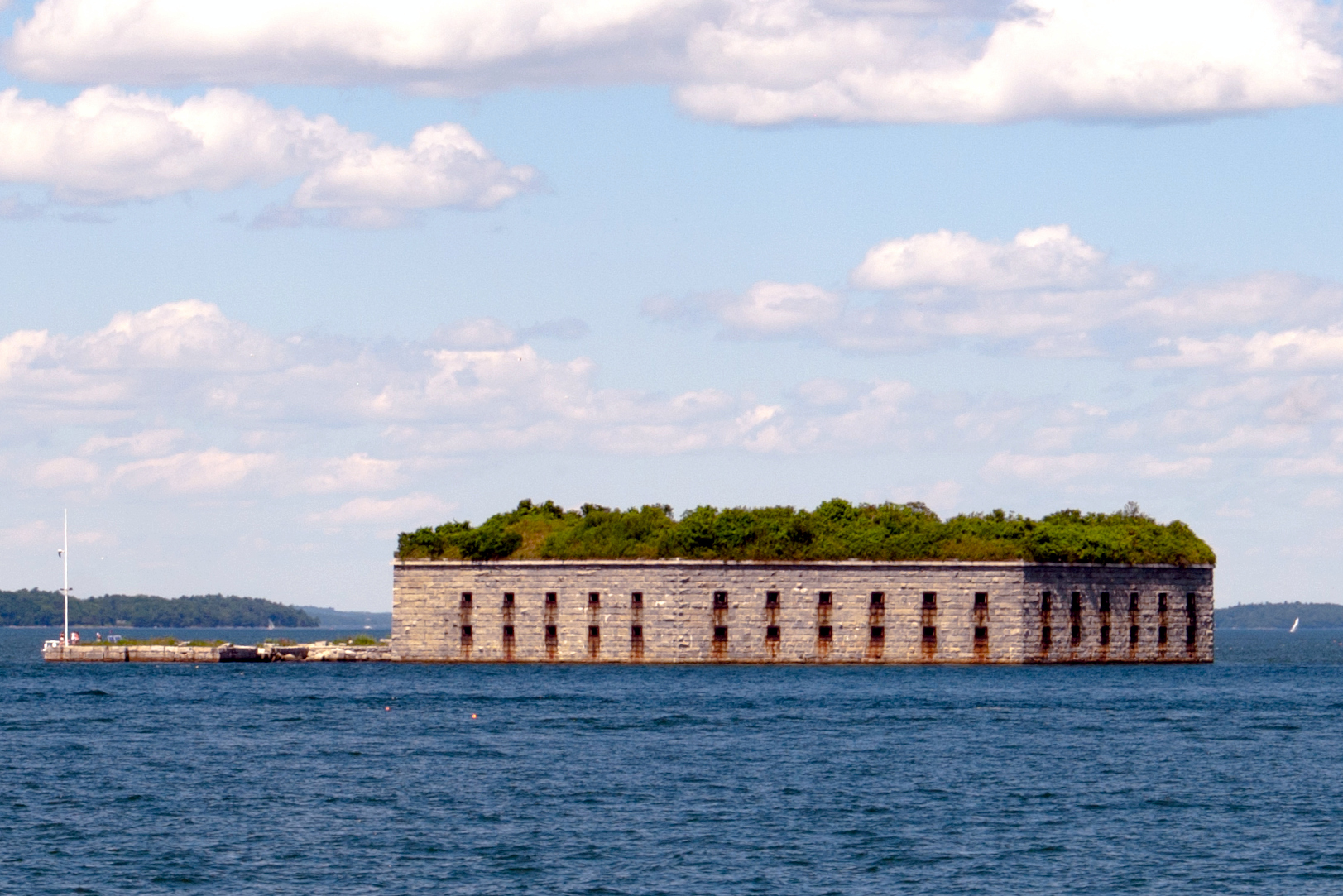
Fort Gorges.

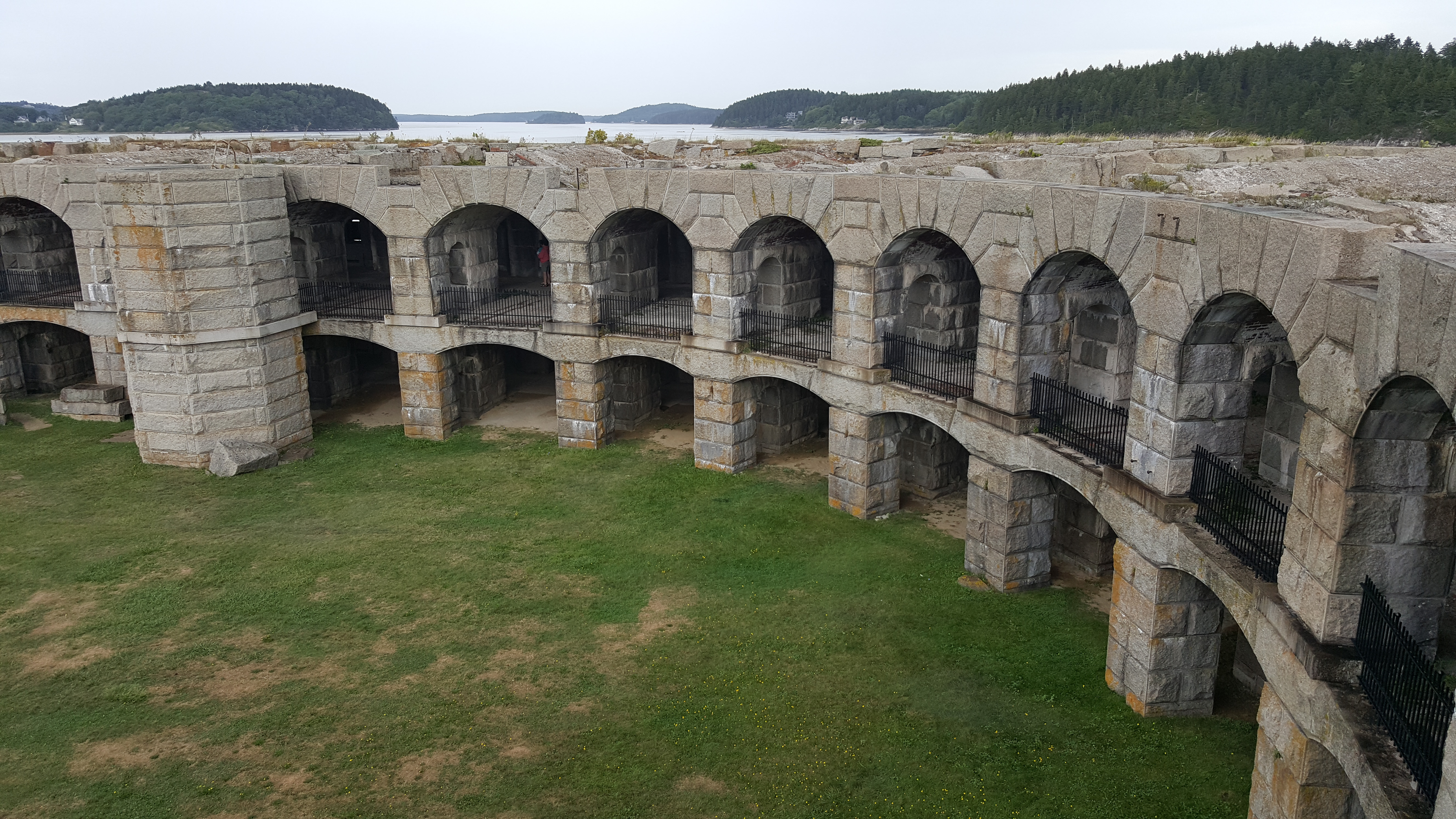
Interior of Fort Popham.

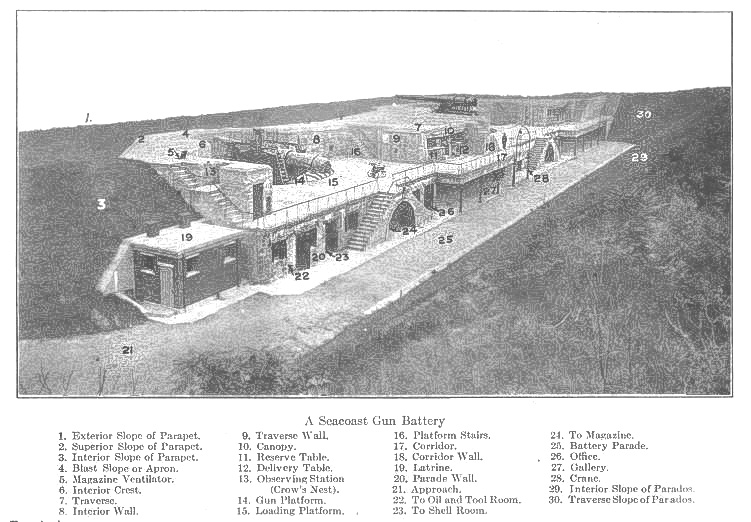
Typical US disappearing gun battery for two guns.

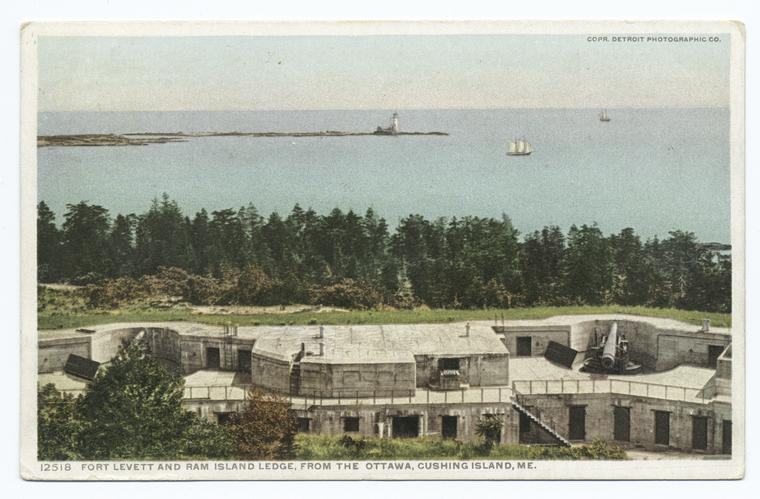
Fort Levett and Ram Island Ledge. From the Ottawa House, Cushing Island, ME., 1909.

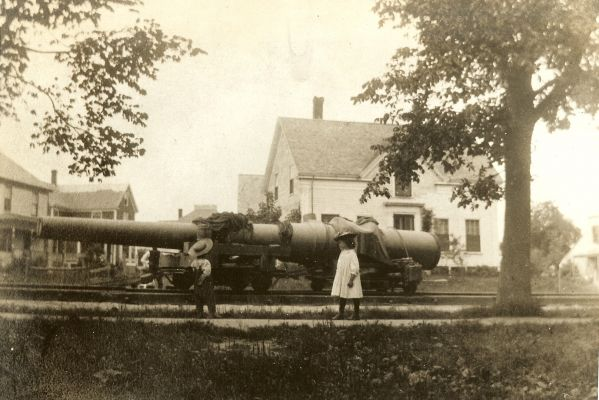
Children look on as a heavy gun is moved to Fort Williams via South Portland's trolley tracks.

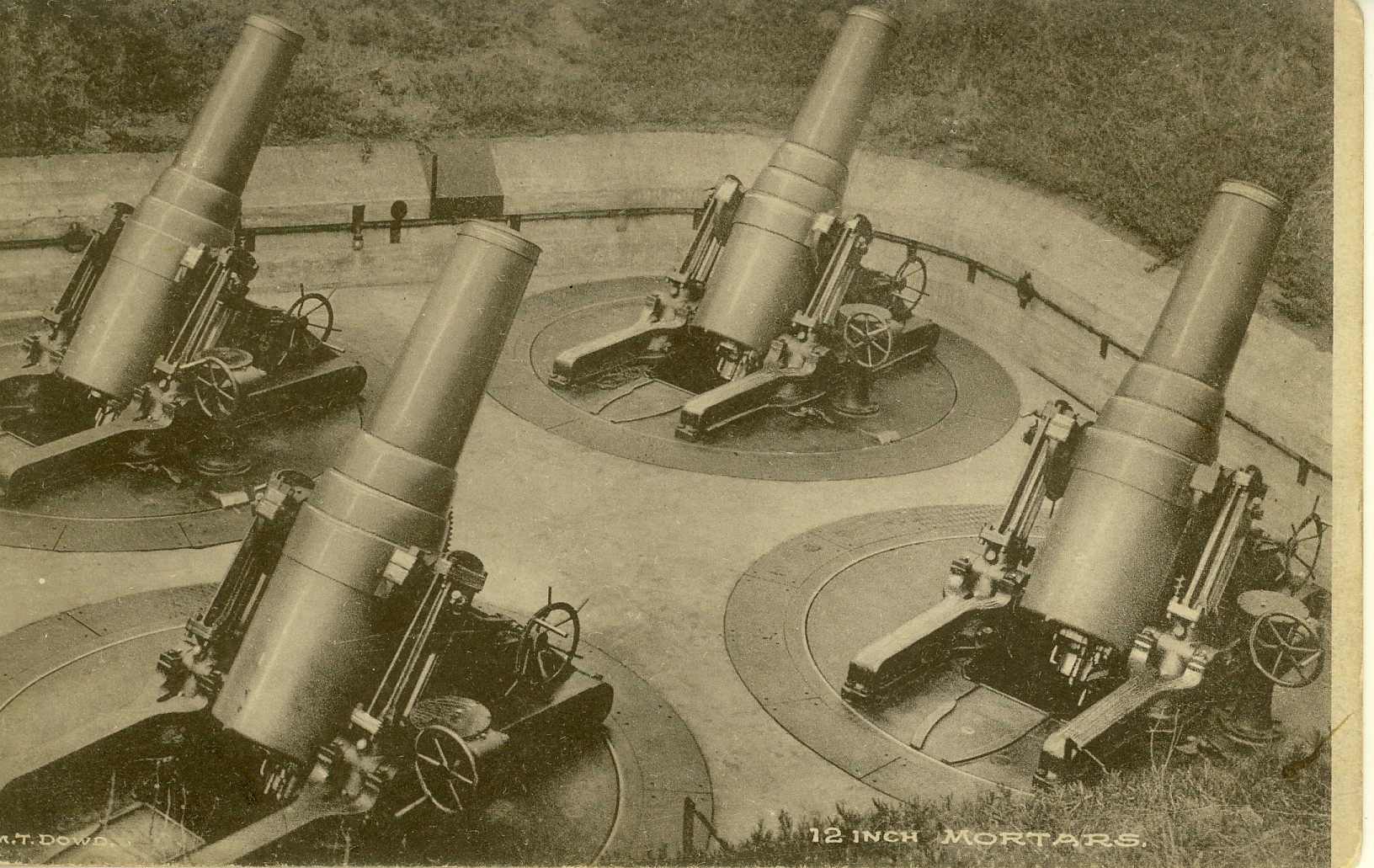
12-inch mortars, similar to those at Fort Preble and Fort McKinley.

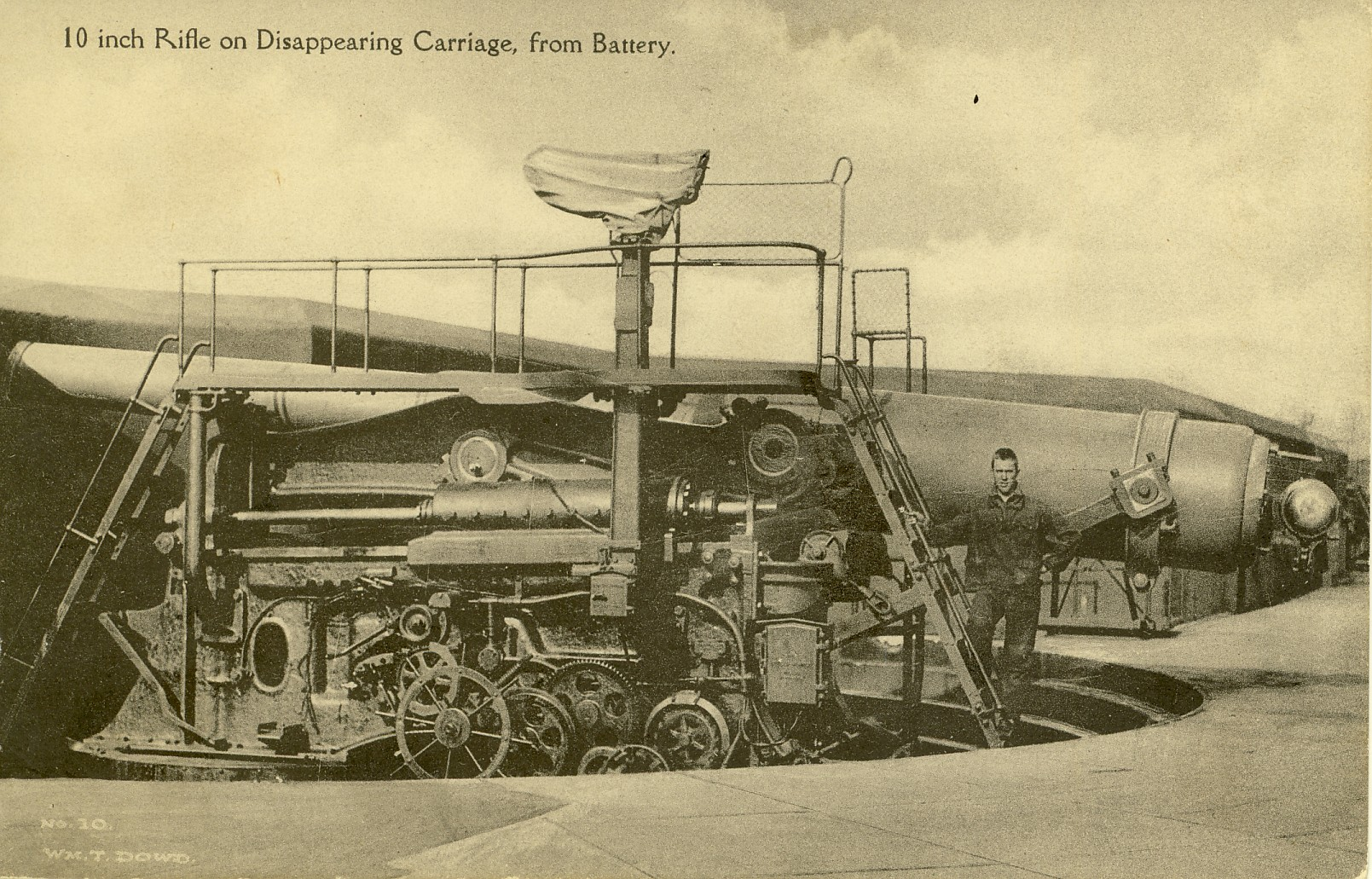
10-inch gun M1888 on disappearing carriage M1896, similar to guns at Fort Williams and Fort Levett.

The Harbor Defenses of Portland was a United States Army Coast Artillery Corps harbor defense command. It coordinated the coast defenses of Portland, Maine, the mouth of the Kennebec River, and surrounding areas from 1895 to 1950, beginning with the Endicott program. These included both coast artillery forts and underwater minefields. The command originated circa 1895 as the Portland Artillery District, was renamed Coast Defenses of Portland in 1913, and again renamed Harbor Defenses of Portland in 1925.

== Coast Defenses of the Kennebec ==
The Kennebec coast defense command may have originated as the Kennebec Artillery District with the establishment of Endicott program minefield support facilities in the 1890s at the Civil War-era Fort Popham in Phippsburg, and deployment of mines there during the Spanish–American War. However, it is unclear from references whether the Coast Defenses of the Kennebec (as it was probably renamed in 1913) was ever a command independent of the Coast Defenses of Portland. At some time prior to 1917 the commands were merged. Between 1905 and 1912 Fort Baldwin was built near Fort Popham, during the Taft Program period. It was one of the smallest forts of the era, with three 6-inch guns and two 3-inch guns. During World War I these forts were garrisoned by two companies of the Coast Defenses of Portland (CD Portland), and references do not show the Kennebec command active during that war or in World War II. Fort Baldwin was disarmed in 1924, although the minefield capability at Fort Popham may have been retained through World War II. Fort Baldwin was rearmed with a battery of four towed 155 mm guns on "Panama mounts" in World War II, operated by Battery D of the 8th Coast Artillery. Some references list Forts Popham and Baldwin with the Harbor Defenses of the Kennebec due to their geographical separation from the Portland area and to be consistent with other fort listings.

== History ==
=== Early Portland forts ===
A Revolutionary War battery existed on the site of Fort Allen Park, and some sources state that it was named Fort Allen at that time. In 1794 Fort Sumner was built on Munjoy Hill in Portland, with a blockhouse at the current Standpipe Park and a water battery or "detached battery", possibly on the site of Fort Allen. Fort Sumner was part of the first system of US fortifications. Additional fortifications were built under the second system of US fortifications, with Fort Preble and Fort Scammell completed in 1809. Fort Preble was in what was then the northern part of Cape Elizabeth, which is now South Portland. Fort Scammell (a.k.a. Fort Scammel) was on House Island, across from Fort Preble. These forts were built due to a war scare with the British, and their construction coincided with the deeply unpopular Embargo Act of 1807, which emerged from the same war scare and prohibited the lucrative trade with Britain and France. The first use the forts were put to was enforcement of the embargo, so the forts' existence was locally suspect. During the War of 1812 (which broke out due to the same tensions with Britain) the city of Portland refurbished and rearmed Fort Allen with city resources, due to fears of a British attack.

Fort Preble was expanded with new batteries in 1845, and Fort Scammell's walls were extended around this time.

In 1858-62 construction began on additional fortifications in Portland harbor, part of the third system of US fortifications. The construction of Fort Gorges on a small ledge island to the north of House Island began in 1858. After the outbreak of the Civil War in 1861, a complete rebuilding of Fort Scammell and a modernization of Fort Preble began in 1862. By the end of the war Fort Gorges was largely complete, while the design of Fort Scammell was cut back to allow completion; Fort Preble's third system batteries were never completed or armed. All three of these forts were modified in the 1870s to provide earthwork-protected batteries for Rodman guns; in the case of Fort Gorges these were on the roof. However, funding was cut off in 1876 with the program partially complete, and it was over 20 years before the modern gun batteries of the Endicott program were completed.

The only enemy action in Portland harbor since the Revolutionary War occurred on 27 June 1863 and was called the Battle of Portland Harbor or the Caleb Cushing affair. Confederate raiders on CSS Tacony, pursued by the Union Navy, captured a fishing vessel named Archer and set fire to Tacony to evade pursuit. They were successful, and infiltrated the port of Portland on Archer. They then seized the Revenue Service cutter Caleb Cushing and attempted to flee the harbor in it along with Archer. A group of about 30 soldiers from Fort Preble and 100 civilians (issued muskets at the fort) commandeered a pair of steamships with a light artillery piece on each one. It appears the Confederates avoided the forts, but soon the wind shifted against them and the Union's steamships closed in. With their capture imminent, the Confederates set fire to Cushing's magazines and abandoned the ship before it blew up. All the Confederates were captured and imprisoned.

=== Endicott period ===
As recommended by the Endicott Board of 1885, construction began in 1893 on five forts to defend Portland harbor. After the outbreak of the Spanish–American War in 1898, several gun batteries were hastily emplaced, as most of the Endicott batteries were still years from completion. It was feared that the Spanish fleet would bombard the US east coast. The locations of most of these batteries, except one 6-inch Armstrong gun at Fort Williams, are unclear, but Fort Preble and Fort McKinley are the most likely sites. A total of six 8-inch M1888 breech-loading guns on converted Rodman carriages, along with a pair of muzzle-loading 8-inch converted Rodman rifles, were emplaced. The 8-inch batteries were disarmed soon after the war, as their weapons were either needed in the Endicott system or were obsolete. The 6-inch battery remained in place until 1913. By 1903 the heavy Endicott gun and mortar batteries were complete, with all batteries complete by 1906. The southern harbor entrance was defended by three forts: Fort Williams in Cape Elizabeth with Fort Levett (sometimes misspelled Fort Leavitt) on Cushing Island at the harbor's mouth, and a totally rebuilt Fort Preble in South Portland further up the channel. The northern entrance was defended by Fort McKinley on Great Diamond Island with Fort Lyon on nearby Cow Island. Two underwater minefields also guarded the harbor entrances. Fort Williams had two 12-inch (305 mm) and five 10-inch (254 mm) guns, Fort Levett had three 12-inch and two 10-inch guns, Fort Preble had sixteen 12-inch mortars, and Fort McKinley had eight 12-inch mortars, two 12-inch guns, and eight 8-inch (203 mm) guns. Each fort also had two or four 6-inch (152 mm) guns and between two and four 3-inch (76 mm) guns. Fort Lyon was the smallest with three 6-inch guns and three 3-inch guns.

=== World War I ===
The American entry into World War I brought many changes to the Coast Artillery and CD Portland. As the only component of the Army with heavy artillery experience and significant manpower, the Coast Artillery was chosen to operate almost all US-manned heavy and railway artillery in that war. Stateside garrisons were drawn down to provide experienced gun crews on the Western Front. Some weapons were removed from forts with the intent of getting US-made artillery into the fight. 8-inch, 10-inch, and 12-inch guns and 12-inch mortars were converted to railway artillery, while 5-inch and 6-inch guns became field guns on wheeled carriages. However, few railway artillery pieces were mounted and few or none saw action before the Armistice. The remounted 5-inch and 6-inch guns were sent to France, but their units did not complete training in time to see action. Two 10-inch guns from Fort Williams and seven 6-inch guns from Forts Williams, McKinley, and Lyon were removed; after the war the 10-inch guns and two of Fort McKinley's 6-inch guns were returned. The mortar batteries at Forts Preble and McKinley were permanently halved, both to provide railway mortars and increase the rate of fire of the remaining mortars (by reducing overcrowding in the mortar pits). At all the forts, numerous temporary buildings were constructed to accommodate the large influx of new recruits. References indicate the authorized strength of CD Portland was 29 companies, including 13 from the Maine National Guard. Nine of these 13 companies were used to form the bulk of the 54th Coast Artillery, a regiment that was sent to France and slated to be armed with 24 6-inch guns. However, on 20 September 1918 the regiment became a training and replacement unit. In March 1919, with the war over, the regiment returned to the United States and was inactivated.

=== Interwar ===
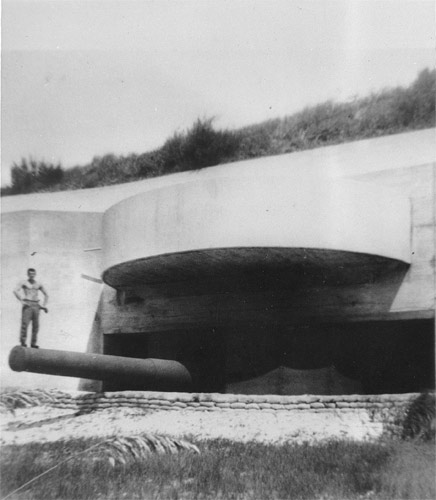
12-inch casemated gun, similar to those at Battery Foote, Fort Levett.

In January 1921 Battery Foote at Fort Levett was completed; this was a battery of two 12-inch (305 mm) guns on long-range barbette carriages that increased the guns' range from 18,400 yards (16,800 m) to 29,300 yards (26,800 m). The battery originally had open mounts, but was casemated in World War II. On 1 July 1924 the harbor defense garrisons completed the transition from a company-based organization to a regimental one, and on 9 June 1925 the commands were renamed from "Coast Defenses..." to "Harbor Defenses...". The 8th Coast Artillery was the Regular Army component of the Harbor Defenses of Portland from 1 July 1924 through 25 February 1944, and the 240th Coast Artillery was the Maine National Guard component from 1924 through 5 October 1944. During this period towed 155 mm (6.1 inch) guns were based at Fort Williams, which served through World War II, according to a plaque on the site.

=== World War II ===
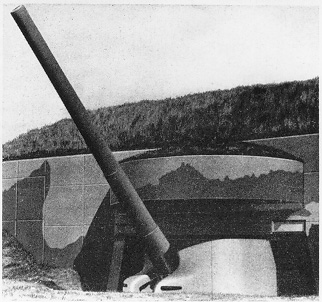
16-inch casemated gun, similar to Battery Steele.

Early in World War II the coastal forts were expanded with numerous temporary buildings to accommodate rapid mobilization of men and equipment. The 240th Coast Artillery was activated on 16 September 1940. After the Fall of France in 1940 the Army decided to replace all existing heavy coast defense guns with 16-inch guns. In 1942 construction began on Battery Steele (also called Battery 102) at the Peaks Island Military Reservation with two 16-inch (406 mm) guns; this battery was substantially complete by late 1944. HD Portland became centered on Peaks Island, the 12-inch (305 mm) Battery Foote, and the minefields. Except for a few of the 6-inch (152 mm) and 3-inch (76 mm) guns, the Endicott-era weapons were scrapped in 1942–44. To supplement the heavy batteries, three batteries of two 6-inch guns each on long-range mountings were constructed, on Peaks Island, the Cape Elizabeth Military Reservation at Two Lights, and the Jewell Island Military Reservation. However, only the Peaks Island battery was armed. Two older 2-gun 6-inch batteries were retained at Forts McKinley and Levett. Three old 3-inch gun batteries were retained at Forts Williams, Preble, and Lyon, while three new 3-inch gun batteries were built on Peaks Island, Long Island, and Great Chebeague Island. An additional 16-inch battery was projected for Cape Elizabeth but never built. Ten Anti-Motor Torpedo Boat (AMTB) batteries were also emplaced at various locations in Casco Bay; these had an authorized strength of four 90 mm guns (two on fixed mounts, two on towed mounts) and two 40 mm Bofors guns. The guns were dual-purpose, able to fire against air or surface targets. The batteries were at Long Island (2), Great Chebeague Island (1), Bailey Island (1), Peaks Island (2), Jewell Island (2), Fort Levett (1), and Fort Williams (1). Battery D, 8th Coast Artillery with four towed 155 mm guns was deployed to Fort Baldwin 1942–1944, and a similar two-gun battery was deployed to Biddeford Pool Military Reservation 1942–1945. With greatly reduced manpower requirements, on 25 February 1944 most of the 8th Coast Artillery's personnel were reassigned to HD Portland and the remaining personnel reassigned elsewhere. On 5 October 1944 the 240th Coast Artillery was redesignated as the 185th and 186th Coast Artillery battalions, as part of an Army-wide move to a battalion-based organization; these units were inactivated on 1 April 1945.

Following mobilization in 1940 HD Portland was subordinate to First Army. On 24 December 1941 the Eastern Theater of Operations (renamed the Eastern Defense Command three months later) was established, with all east coast harbor defense commands subordinate to it, along with antiaircraft and fighter assets. This command was disestablished in 1946.

The US Navy also participated in defending Casco Bay with net defenses and submarine-detecting indicator loops, with stations at Fort Williams, Peaks Island (Station 1F), Cape Elizabeth (Two Lights) (Station 1B), and Bailey Island (Station 1A).

Although it was a major naval anchorage, the Casco Bay area saw action only once in World War II. USS Eagle 56 (PE-56) exploded and sank a few miles east of the Cape Elizabeth Military Reservation on 23 April 1945. Despite some evidence of an enemy submarine in the area, a Court of Inquiry initially attributed this to a boiler explosion. However, in 2001 the Navy determined that Eagle 56 was torpedoed by U-853, a German U-boat that was later sunk in the Battle of Point Judith, Rhode Island on 5–6 May 1945, two days before Germany's surrender.

=== Post World War II ===
Following the war, it was soon determined that gun defenses were obsolete, and they were scrapped within a few years. By 1948 this was complete, and the remaining coast defense functions were turned over to the Navy. On 1 January 1950 the Coast Artillery Corps and all Army harbor defense commands were finally dissolved. Today the Air Defense Artillery carries the lineage of some Coast Artillery units.

== Present ==
As of 2016, Fort Allen Park includes two reconstructed revetments with Civil War-era guns and several war memorials, notably a 6-inch gun from USS Maine and the foremast and bridge shield of USS Portland. No trace remains of Fort Sumner's blockhouse. Fort Preble is the campus of Southern Maine Community College, with some batteries and numerous garrison buildings intact, along with good views of Fort Scammell and Fort Gorges. Fort Gorges can be visited by boat, and has an unmounted 300-pounder (10-inch) Parrott rifle on the roof. Forts Scammell and Levett are well-preserved, but are on private islands that require advance permission to visit. Battery Steele and the 6-inch battery on Peaks Island are also well-preserved; the 6-inch battery has been converted into part of a private residence. The 6-inch batteries on Jewell Island and at Two Lights State Park (formerly the Cape Elizabeth Military Reservation) remain, and the battery at Two Lights has an interpretive plaque with an interior diagram. Several fire control towers remain at various locations around Casco Bay. Fort Williams has become Fort Williams Park of the town of Cape Elizabeth; most of the batteries were buried and most of the garrison buildings demolished in the 1980s to make room for green space. One 12-inch gun position is only partly buried, and the 3-inch Battery Keyes is preserved intact. Fort McKinley and its garrison buildings are largely intact, although most of the gun positions are overgrown. Forts Popham and Baldwin are well-preserved, with Fort Baldwin open to the public, while the interior of Fort Popham can be viewed from the back.

== Coat of arms ==
=== Blazon ===
- Shield

Per fess Gules and Argent, in chief a mullet of the last, in base a pine tree Proper.

- Crest

On a wreath of the colors Argent and Gules a phoenix Purpure ailleroned Or rising from flames Proper. Motto: TERRAE PORTAM DEFENDAMUS (We Defend The Land Gate).

=== Symbolism ===
- Shield

The star has a dual significance. Its five points represent the five forts in the Coast Defenses; in addition it represents the Pole Star, those being the most northerly defenses in the country. It is set on a field of artillery red. The pine tree is the emblem of Maine, and is on a white field symbolic of the snows among which this particular pine (Pinus Rigidus) grows. The motto translates to "We Defend the Land Gate." "Terrae Portam" is also the Latin equivalent for Portland and "Defendamus" is the motto of the Coast Artillery Corps.

- Crest

The crest is taken from the arms of the city of Portland which was thrice destroyed in war by burning, by the Indians in 1676, by the French in 1690 and by the English fleet in 1775, but each time it has risen phoenix-like from its ashes.

=== Background ===
The coat of arms was initially approved in 1919 for the Coast Defenses of Portland. It was later approved for the 8th Coast Artillery Regiment on 13 March 1924. It was amended to correct the translation of the motto on 31 March 1928. The insignia was redesignated for the 27th Antiaircraft Artillery Automatic Weapons Battalion on 14 January 1952.

== See also ==
- Seacoast defense in the United States
- Harbor Defense Command
- List of coastal fortifications of the United States
