= Jewell Island =

Island in Casco Bay, Maine, US

Coordinates: 43°40′53″N 70°05′35″W

Jewell Island is a small island in Casco Bay, Maine, United States. Approximately 1 mile (1.6 km) long from southwest to northeast, it is located off the coast of Cliff Island, approximately eight miles from downtown Portland. It is a state-owned island with a small but protected harbor as well as camping and walking paths. Jewell Island was part of the Harbor Defenses of Portland fort network. The island is part of the city of Portland. Jewell Island can be reached by private or charter boats. There is no ferry service to the island.

The island is rich in legend—tales are told of Captain Kidd cruising its coast and hiding treasure. The World War II bunkers are said to be haunted by soldiers, and the beaches by bootleggers. Several accounts of ghostly encounters can be heard in local towns.

6-inch gun on shielded barbette carriage at Fort Columbia State Park, Washington state. This was the type of gun BCN 202 on Jewell Island would have had if completed.

During World War II, the island included the Jewell Island Military Reservation. Three coastal artillery gun batteries were constructed on the island. The largest, although never completed, was Battery Construction Number (BCN) 202. It was designed for two 6-inch guns in shielded mounts that would be on the large concrete circles at each end of the battery. Positions for two Anti-Motor Torpedo Boat (AMTB) batteries with 90 mm guns were also constructed on Jewell Island. Each battery was authorized four 90 mm guns, two on fixed mounts and two on towed mounts. The guns were dual-purpose, able to fire against air or surface targets. The batteries were designated AMTB 967 and AMTB 968. The World War II construction was part of a modernization of the Harbor Defenses of Portland, centered on Battery Steele on Peaks Island, which the fire control towers and SCR-296 radar on Jewell Island supported.

== See also ==
- Seacoast defense in the United States
- Stephen Larrabee
