= Two Lights State Park =

State park in Maine, United States

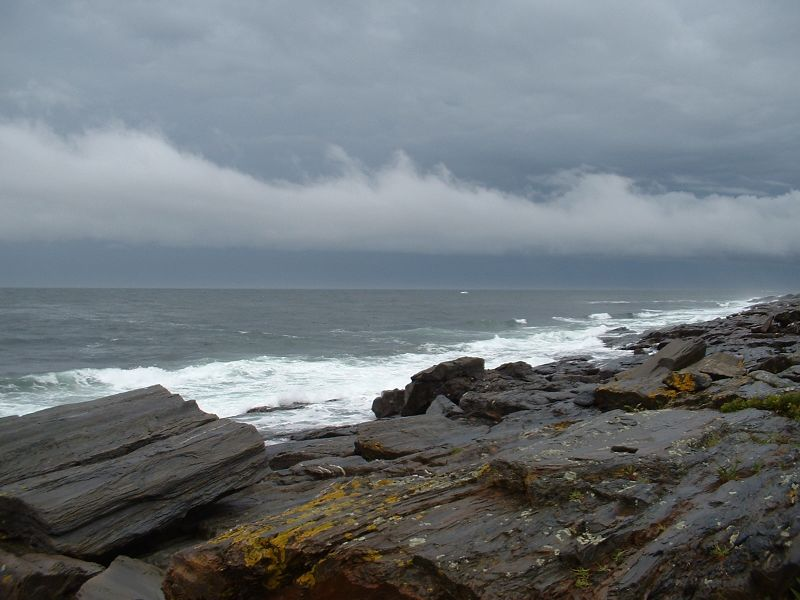

- Location within Maine
- Interactive map of Two Lights State Park
- Location: Cape Elizabeth, Maine, United States
- Coordinates: 43°33′37″N 70°12′33″W
- Area: 41 acres (17 ha)
- Elevation: 66 ft (20 m)
- Established: 1961
- Administrator: Maine Department of Agriculture, Conservation and Forestry
- Website: Official website
- Maine State Parks

Two Lights State Park is a public recreation area occupying 41 acres (17 ha) of headland on Cape Elizabeth, Maine, that offers views of Casco Bay and the Atlantic Ocean. The state park, which opened in 1961, is named after the twin Cape Elizabeth Lights, although there are no lighthouses in the park itself. In addition to rocky headlands, the park includes the remains of a World War II–era seacoast battery bunker and a fire control tower. It is managed by the Maine Department of Agriculture, Conservation and Forestry.

== History ==
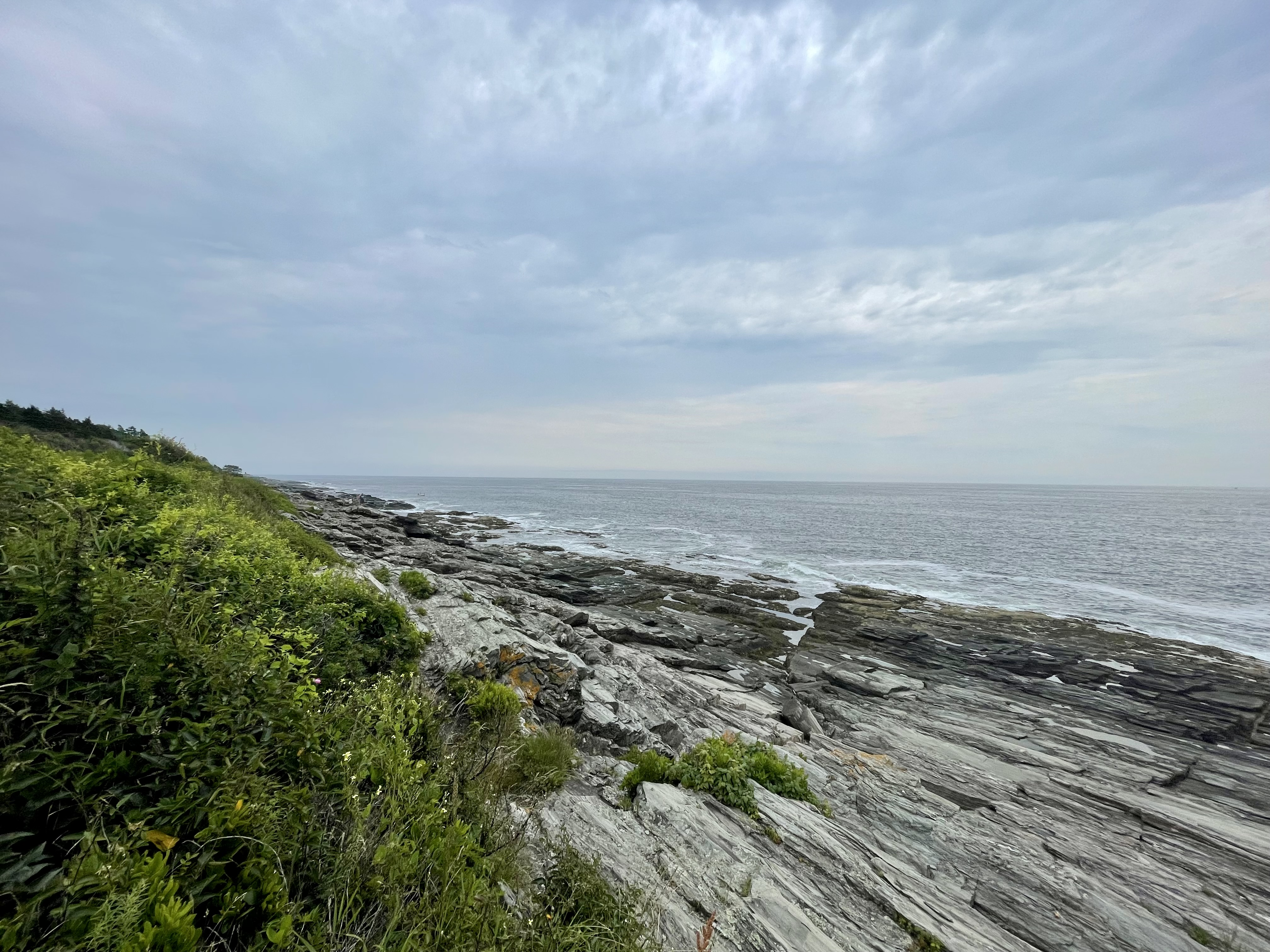
Looking towards the Atlantic Ocean from Two Lights State Park

Geologic

The park's ledges are made up of metamorphic rock that first accumulated as sediment at the bottom of the ocean during the Silurian period. The park's underlying bedrock belongs to the Kittery formation found in New Hampshire and along the Maine coast.

Maritime

The nearby twin lighthouses were built in 1828, but cannot be viewed from this park. The easternmost light is still active; the other was decommissioned in 1924, served as a fire control tower in World War II, and is now a private home. Although the lighthouses cannot be seen from within the park, they can be viewed from a turnaround at the end of Two Lights Road. Edward Hopper made one of the towers the subject of his 1929 painting The Lighthouse at Two Lights, which was used on a U.S. postage stamp in 1970 commemorating the sesquicentennial of Maine statehood.

Military

During World War II, the park area was the Cape Elizabeth Military Reservation. The coast defense battery in the park was Battery Construction Number (BCN) 201, designed for two 6-inch guns in shielded mounts that would be on the large concrete circles at each end of the bunker. As of 2016 an interpretive plaque on one of the gun positions shows the internal arrangement of the bunker. However, with the threat from surface ships nearly non-existent by the time the battery was completed, it was not armed. It was part of a modernization of the Harbor Defenses of Portland, centered on Battery Steele on Peaks Island. A duplicate of Battery Steele, BCN 101 with two 16-inch guns, was planned for an area near the park but never built.

USS Eagle 56 (PE-56) exploded and sank a few miles east of the Cape Elizabeth Military Reservation on April 23, 1945. Despite some evidence of an enemy submarine in the area, a Court of Inquiry initially attributed this to a boiler explosion. However, in 2001 the Navy determined that Eagle 56 was torpedoed by U-853, a German U-boat that was later sunk in the Battle of Point Judith, Rhode Island on 5–6 May 1945, two days before Germany's surrender.

6-inch gun on shielded barbette carriage at Fort Columbia State Park, Washington state. This was the type of gun the battery at Two Lights would have had if armed.

== Activities and amenities ==
The park offers a network of paths of nearly two miles, traversing both forested lands and seaside rock ledges. Facilities include benches along the shore, restrooms, playground, and picnic tables.

== Additional reading ==
- United States Army (1941). "Harbor Defenses of Portland, 1941: pictorial history". World War Regimental Histories. World War Regimental Histories. 99. Atlanta, GA: Army-Navy Publications.
