= Peaks Island Land Preserve =

Non-profit organization concerning natural land of Peaks Island

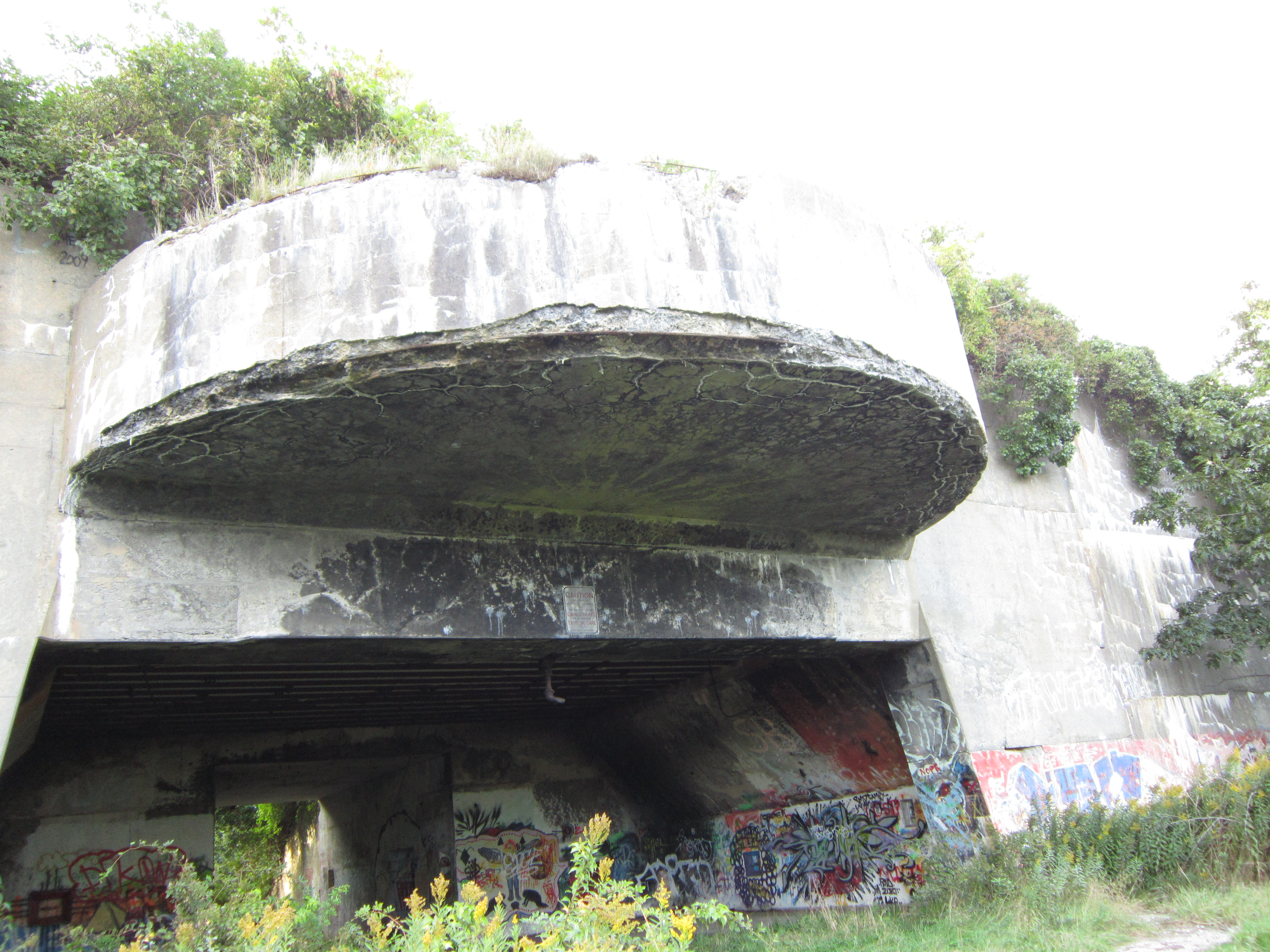
Battery Steele, preserved in 1994 by the Peaks Island Land Preserve.

The Peaks Island Land Preserve (PILP) is a non-profit organization concerned with conserving natural land on Peaks Island, Maine for public use. As of 2013, the PILP managed over 140 acres (57 ha) of land. It was founded in 1994 to preserve Battery Steele, an historic United States military fortification built on Peaks Island during World War II. After acquiring Battery Steele, PILP began to obtain land through purchase and donation across the island. The PILP held its first post-incorporation meeting in 1995 at the Fifth Maine Regiment Community Center.
