= 8th Coast Artillery (United States) =

8th Coast Artillery Regiment
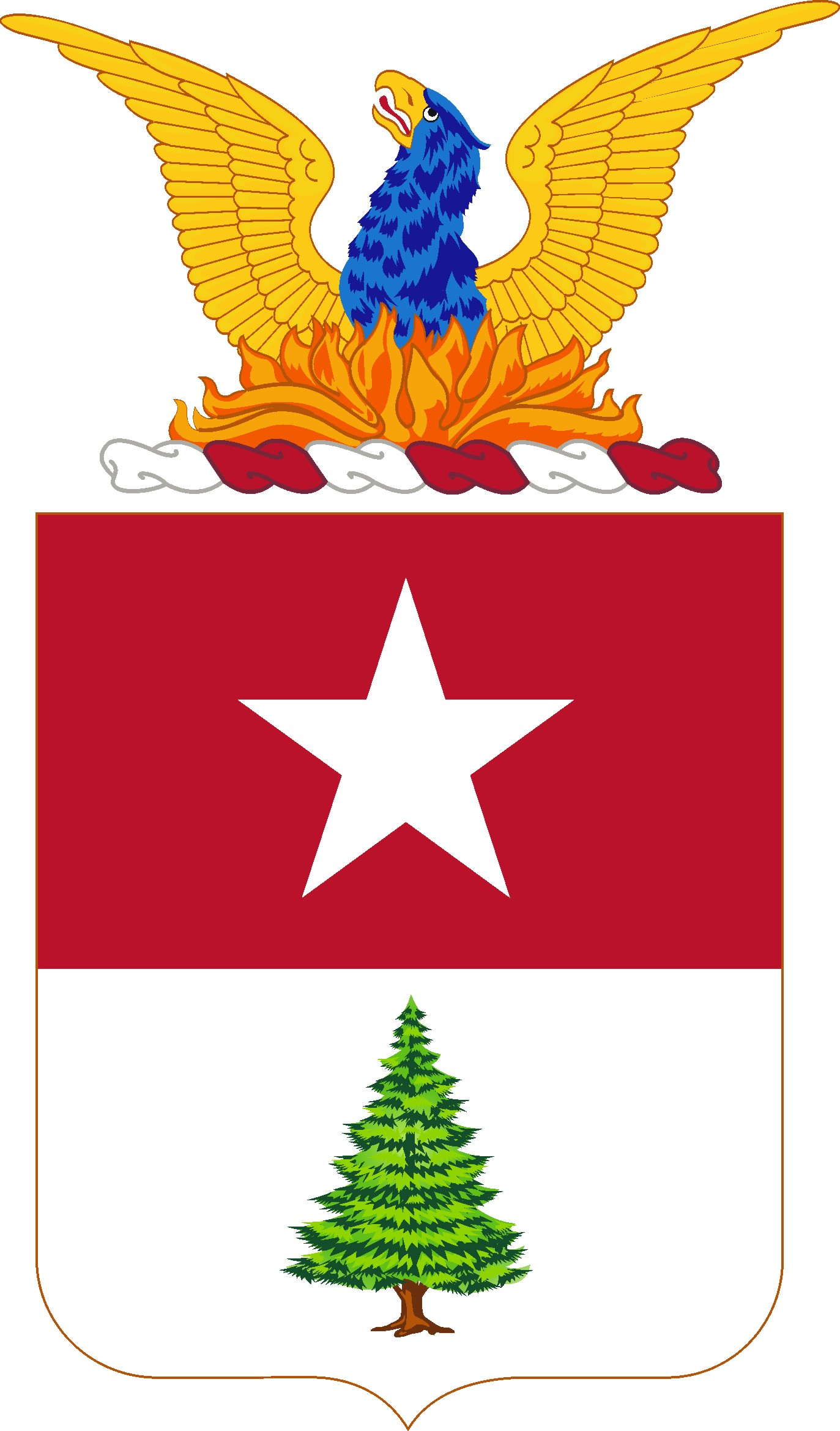
- Coat of arms
- Active: 1924 - 1944
- Country: United States
- Branch: Army
- Type: Coast artillery
- Role: Harbor defense
- Size: Regiment
- Part of: Harbor Defenses of Portland; Harbor Defenses of Portsmouth
- Garrison/HQ: Fort Preble
- Motto(s): "Terrae Portam Defendamus" (We Defend The Land Gate)
- Mascot(s): Oozlefinch

The 8th Coast Artillery Regiment was a Coast Artillery Corps regiment in the United States Army, which garrisoned the Harbor Defenses of Portland (HD Portland), Maine 1924–1944, and the Harbor Defenses of Portsmouth, New Hampshire 1924–1940.

== History ==
The 8th Coast Artillery was constituted 27 February 1924 and organized 1 July 1924 as the Regular Army component of the Harbor Defenses of Portland (HD Portland), Maine through early 1944; the 240th Coast Artillery was the Maine National Guard component of those defenses. In early 1944 most of the 8th Coast Artillery's personnel were transferred to HD Portland and the regiment was soon disbanded. The 8th CA also garrisoned the Harbor Defenses of Portsmouth, New Hampshire at caretaker strength from 1924 through early 1940. At that time the 22nd Coast Artillery was activated from personnel of the HD Portsmouth caretaker detachment, relieving the 8th Coast Artillery of that duty.

== Lineage ==
The lineage of the 8th Coast Artillery is as follows:

Constituted 27 February 1924 as the 8th Coast Artillery (HD) Regiment, and organized at Fort Preble 1 July 1924 by redesignating the 123rd, 154th, 155th, 171st, 196th, 156th, 246th, and 251st companies of Coast Artillery Corps. Only regimental Headquarters and Headquarters Battery (HHB) and Battery E activated as caretaker units; HHB for HD Portland, Battery E for HD Portsmouth.

- Battery A activated at Fort Preble 1 July 1939.
- Battery E inactivated at Fort Constitution 1 September 1939, caretaker duties transferred to a detachment of HHB until relieved by 22nd CA in February.
- Battery B activated at Fort Preble 29 July 1940.
- 1st Battalion Headquarters and Battery C activated 10 February 1941 at Fort Preble.
- 2nd Battalion Headquarters and Batteries D, E, and F activated at Fort McKinley 10 February 1941.
- Battery G (Searchlight) activated at Fort Preble 1 June 1941.
- Battery D garrisoned Fort Baldwin at the mouth of the Kennebec River with a battery of four towed 155 mm guns 1942–1944.

On 11 September 1943 a third battalion was authorized.

- Battery G redesignated as Battery K, remained the searchlight battery,
- 4th Battalion 241st Coast Artillery transferred from HD Boston to Portland and redesignated as 3rd Battalion 8th Coast Artillery,
- Batteries K and M 241st Coast Artillery redesignated Batteries G and H 8th CA,
- Battery D 243rd Coast Artillery transferred from HD Narragansett Bay to Portland and redesignated Battery I 8th CA.
- Battery E 10th Coast Artillery transferred from HD Narragansett Bay to Portland (less personnel and equipment) and redesignated Battery L 8th CA 26 July 1943.

The 8th Coast Artillery was ordered to Camp Shelby, Mississippi 25 February 1944 (less Battery B), released to Army Ground Forces, and assigned to IX Corps, Second Army.

- Battery B ordered to Fort Jackson, South Carolina.
- 8th Coast Artillery Regiment disbanded 31 May 1944.

== Distinctive unit insignia ==
- Description

A Gold metal and enamel device 1 1/8 (2.86 cm) in height overall consisting of a shield blazoned: Per fess Gules and Argent, in chief a mullet of the last, in base a pine tree Proper.

- Symbolism

The 8th Regiment was organized under General Orders No. 8, 27 February 1924, on 30 June 1924, from the companies which comprised the garrison of the Coast Defenses of Portland and Portsmouth. The design is taken from the coat of arms of the old Coast Defenses of Portland. The star has a dual significance. Its five points represent the five forts in the Coast Defenses of Portland; in addition it represents the Pole Star, those being the most northerly defenses in the country. It is set on a field of artillery red. The pine tree is the emblem of Maine, and is on a white field symbolic of the snows among which this particular pine (Pinus Rigidus) grows.

- Background

The distinctive unit insignia was originally approved for the 8th Coast Artillery Regiment on 24 March 1924. It was amended to add the method of wear on 10 November 1924. The insignia was redesignated for the 27th Antiaircraft Artillery Automatic Weapons Battalion on 14 January 1952.

== Coat of arms ==
=== Blazon ===
- Shield

Per fess Gules and Argent, in chief a mullet of the last, in base a pine tree Proper.

- Crest

On a wreath of the colors Argent and Gules a phoenix Purpure aileroned Or rising from flames Proper. Motto: TERRAE PORTAM DEFENDAMUS (We Defend The Land Gate).

=== Symbolism ===
- Shield

The 8th Regiment was organized under General Orders No. 8, 27 February 1924, on 30 June 1924, from the companies which composed the garrison of the Coast Defenses of Portland and Portsmouth. The coat of arms is that of the old Coast Defenses of Portland. The star has a dual significance. Its five points represent the five forts in the Coast Defenses; in addition it represents the Pole Star, those being the most northerly defenses in the country. It is set on a field of artillery red. The pine tree is the emblem of Maine, and is on a white field symbolic of the snows among which this particular pine (Pinus Rigidus) grows. The motto translates to "We Defend the Land Gate." "Terrae Portam" is also the Latin equivalent for Portland and "Defendamus" is the motto of the Coast Artillery Corps.

- Crest

The crest is taken from the arms of the city of Portland which was thrice destroyed in war by burning, by the Indians in 1676, by the French in 1690 and by the English fleet in 1775, but each time it has risen phoenix-like from its ashes.

=== Background ===
The coat of arms was originally approved for the 8th Coast Artillery Regiment on 13 March 1924. It was amended to correct the translation of the motto on 31 March 1928. The insignia was redesignated for the 27th Antiaircraft Artillery Automatic Weapons Battalion on 14 January 1952.

== See also ==
- Seacoast defense in the United States
- United States Army Coast Artillery Corps
- Harbor Defense Command
- Distinctive unit insignia (U.S. Army)
