= Middlebury Register =

Newspaper published in Middlebury Vermont

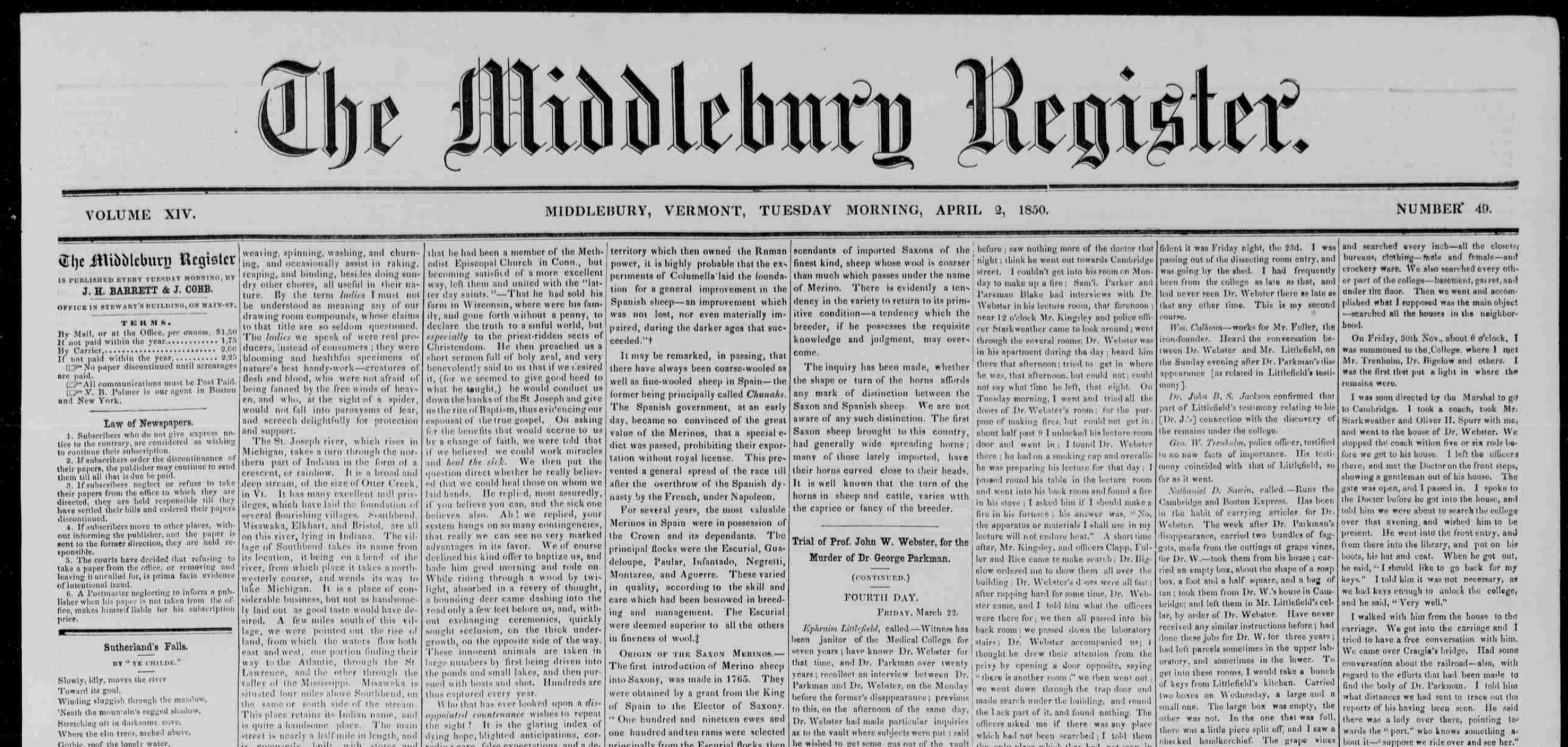
- Middlebury Register, April 02, 1850
- Type: Weekly newspaper
- Founded: 1836
- Ceased publication: 1947
- OCLC number: 57700887

The Middlebury Register was a weekly newspaper published in Middlebury, Vermont from 1836 through 1947, one of Vermont's longest running weekly newspapers.

== History ==
The newspaper began as a campaign paper for the Whig Party, founded by Justus Cobb and Daniel Spooner in 1836. Cobb left soon afterward, but returned as printer and publisher from 1842 until 1859. Local publisher and philanthropist Joseph Battell ran the newspaper from 1883-1919. As Battell was a horse enthusiast, the paper contained an illustrated "Horse Department" featuring articles about Morgan horses which were his favorite. He would also frequently publish news about local automobile accidents because he didn't like cars' pollution and displacement of horses.

The paper's original name was the People's Press, and Anti-Masonic Democrat. It underwent frequent name changes until 1850 being known by names such as People's Press, Addison County Democrat, Northern Galaxy, Middlebury People's Press, Middlebury Galaxy, Middlebury Register, and Middlebury Register and Addison County Journal. In 1850 the newspaper changed its name to the Middlebury Register and maintained that name until the last decade of its existence when it became the Middlebury Register & Addison County Journal from 1937 to 1947.
