= Battery Steele =

United States military fortification in Maine

- Part of Harbor Defenses of Portland
- Peaks Island, Maine

Site information
- Type: Fortification
- Open to the public: Yes
- Battery Steele
- U.S. National Register of Historic Places
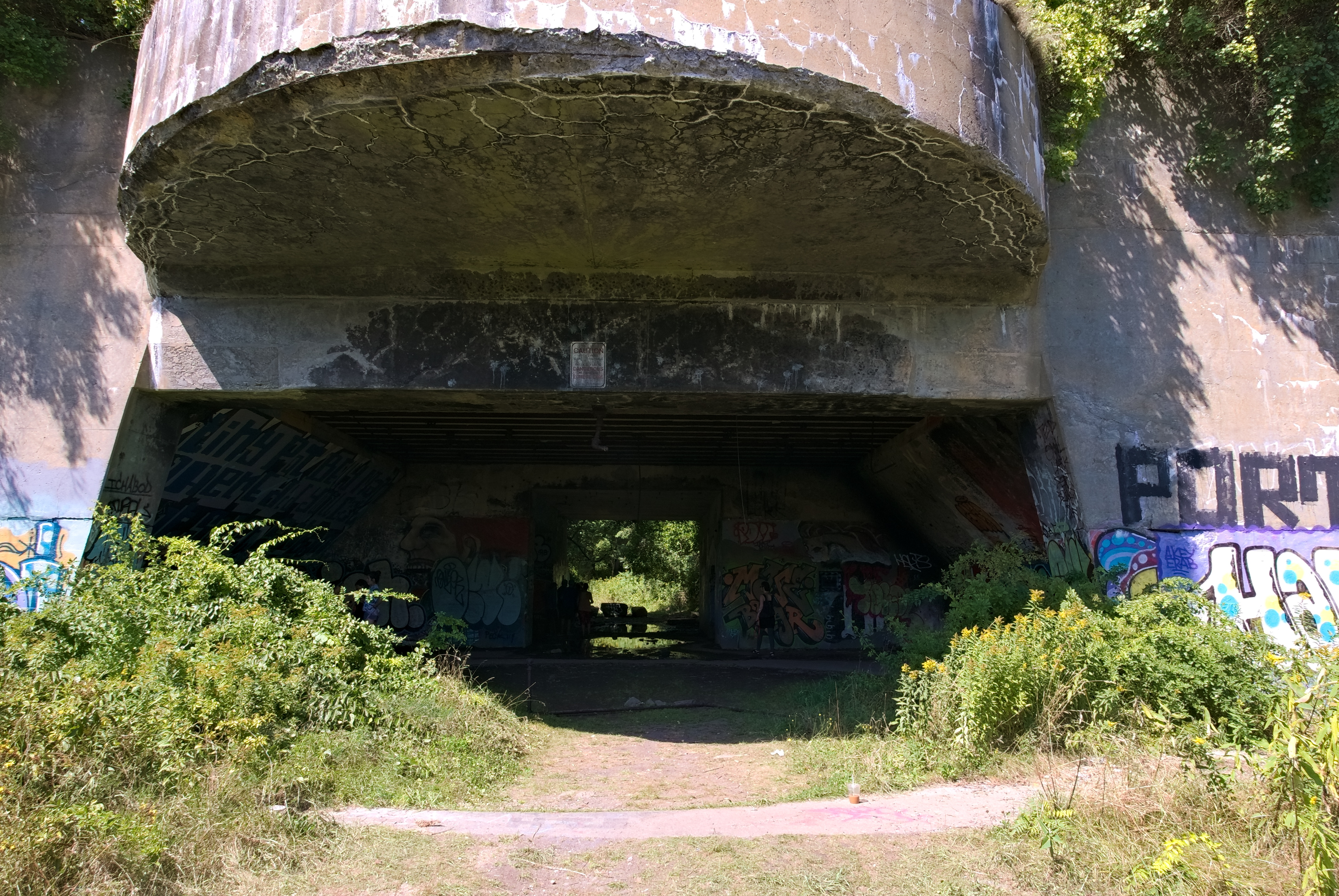
- Battery Steele on Peaks Island, Portland, Maine

- Location within Maine Location within the United States
- Location: Peaks Island, Portland, Maine
- Coordinates: 43°39′32″N 70°10′50″W
- Built: 1942
- Architect: U.S. Army Corps of Engineers
- NRHP reference No.: 05001176
- Added to NRHP: October 20, 2005

Site history
- Built: 1942–1945
- Built by: U.S. Army Corps of Engineers
- In use: 1942–1945
- Materials: Reinforced concrete, earth
- Battles/wars: World War II

Garrison information
- Garrison: Harbor Defenses of Portland

Battery Steele (U.S. Army Corps of Engineers Battery Construction #102) is a United States military fortification on Peaks Island, Portland, Maine, in Casco Bay. Completed in 1942 as part of World War II, it is located on 14 acres (5.7 ha) on the oceanside area of the island, formerly part of the Peaks Island Military Reservation. It is named for Harry L. Steele, who was a Coast Artillery officer during World War I. It was armed with two 16-inch MkIIMI guns and, with a 12-inch gun battery at Fort Levett on Cushing Island, replaced all previous heavy guns in the Harbor Defenses of Portland. It was built to protect Casco Bay, particularly Portland harbor, from Kennebunk to Popham Beach in Phippsburg. According to Kim MacIsaac and historian Joel Eastman in An Island at War, “Battery Steele is not only the largest gun battery built on Peaks Island, but also an example of the largest battery ever built anywhere in the United States.” In 1995, after decades of non-use, the Peaks Island Land Preserve, a community land preservation group, formed to purchase the area and forever preserve it as a public space. On October 20, 2005, the property was listed on the National Register of Historic Places. Other coast defense structures on the island include fire control towers and the counterweight for a disappearing searchlight tower (it "disappeared" when folded down).

== Associated batteries ==
Battery Steele was part of a comprehensive program begun in 1940 to replace obsolete coast defenses, many of which dated from the Endicott Program of 1885-1905. In the Harbor Defenses of Portland, the only large-caliber (8-inch or larger) pre-war battery still in use by 1944 was Battery Foote at Fort Levett, Cushing Island, casemated like Battery Steele to resist air attack and armed with two 12-inch guns on long-range carriages. Another two-gun 16-inch battery, Battery Construction Number (BCN) 101, was planned for the Cape Elizabeth Military Reservation near Two Lights State Park, but was cancelled as the threat to the US East Coast from surface ships was nearly non-existent by 1943.

Smaller batteries were also built during World War II. Three two-gun 6-inch batteries were built in Casco Bay, but only one of these was armed. The armed battery was Battery Cravens (BCN 203), also on Peaks Island, now part of a private residence. The other two were BCN 201 in Two Lights State Park and BCN 202 on Jewell Island. Older 6-inch gun batteries retained in service in Casco Bay included two two-gun batteries at Fort McKinley on Great Diamond Island and Fort Levett on Cushing Island. Three older 3-inch gun batteries were retained at Fort Williams near Portland Head Light, Fort Preble in South Portland, and Fort Lyon on Cow Island. Three new two-gun 3-inch batteries were constructed during World War II, on Peaks Island, Long Island, and Great Chebeague Island. Positions for a total of ten Anti-Motor Torpedo Boat (AMTB) batteries with 90 mm guns were constructed in Casco Bay. Each battery was authorized four 90 mm guns, two on fixed mounts and two on towed mounts; the actual number of guns on hand for each battery may have varied. The guns were dual-purpose, able to fire against air or surface targets. The batteries were at Long Island (2), Great Chebeague Island (1), Bailey Island (1), Peaks Island (2), Jewell Island (2), Fort Levett (1), and Fort Williams (1). All US coast defenses were abandoned and most of the guns scrapped shortly after World War II.

== Gallery ==
Southwest Entrance to Battery Steele

Interior of Battery Steele

== See also ==
- Seacoast defense in the United States
- United States Army Coast Artillery Corps
- List of coastal fortifications of the United States
- National Register of Historic Places listings in Portland, Maine
