= Fort McKinley (Maine) =

- Fort McKinley Historic District
- U.S. National Register of Historic Places
- U.S. Historic district
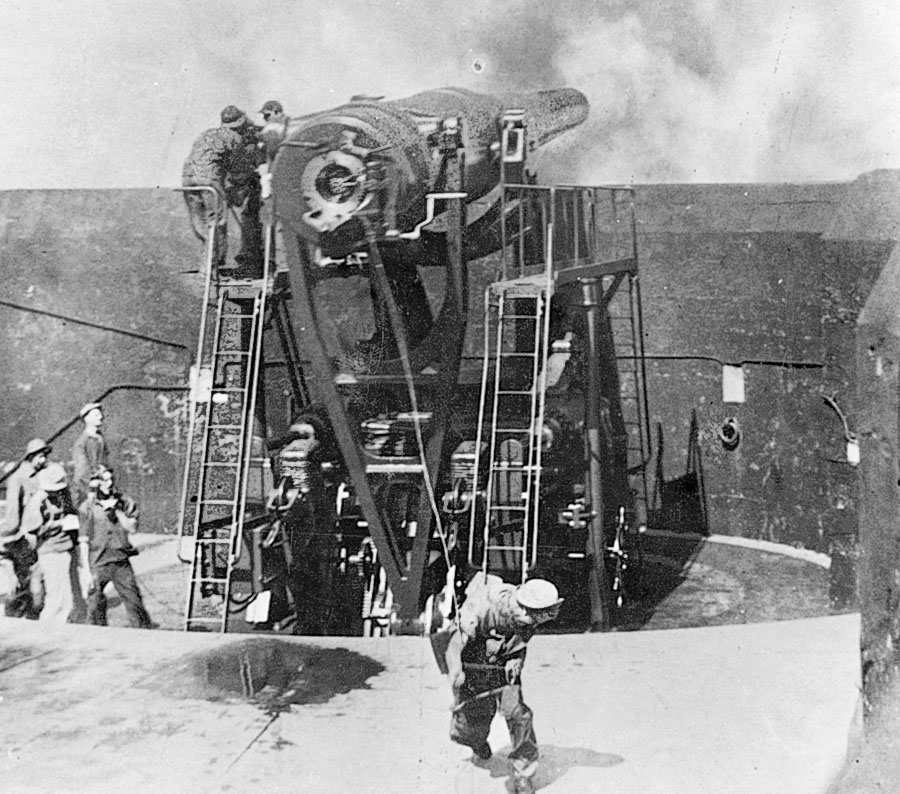
- 12-inch disappearing gun, similar to those mounted at Fort McKinley

- Location within Maine Location within the United States
- Location: Great Diamond Island, Maine
- Coordinates: 43°40′45″N 70°11′50″W
- Area: 43 acres (17 ha)
- Built: 1897
- Architect: US Army Corps of Engineers
- NRHP reference No.: 85000611
- Added to NRHP: 21 March 1985

Fort McKinley is a former United States Army coastal defense fort on Great Diamond Island, Maine in Casco Bay, which operated from 1873 to 1947. It was named for President William McKinley on February 14, 1902. It included a sub-post, Fort Lyon, on Cow Island, just north of Great Diamond Island. Fort Lyon was named for Nathaniel Lyon. Both forts were part of the Coast Defenses of Portland, renamed the Harbor Defenses of Portland in 1925, a command which protected Portland's port and naval anchorage 1895–1950. In 1946, Fort Lyon was closed and turned over to the City of Portland. After Fort McKinley's closure, it was transferred to the United States Navy, which sold the site (via the General Services Administration) to private interests in 1961. The Fort McKinley Historic District was listed on the National Register of Historic Places in 1985.

== History ==
1902 plan of Fort McKinley

=== Construction and armament ===
The Board of Fortifications, often called the Endicott Board, recommended a comprehensive program of new fortifications in 1885. Forts McKinley and Lyon were among the results. Construction on Fort McKinley began in 1897 and was complete by 1906. Fort McKinley totaled 190 acres (77 ha) resulting from two land purchases in 1873 and 1901. The fort was divided by Diamond Cove into a North Fork and a South Fork. The entirety of Cow Island was acquired by the government in 1873; Fort Lyon was built on 22 acres (8.9 ha) of it and was complete by 1909.

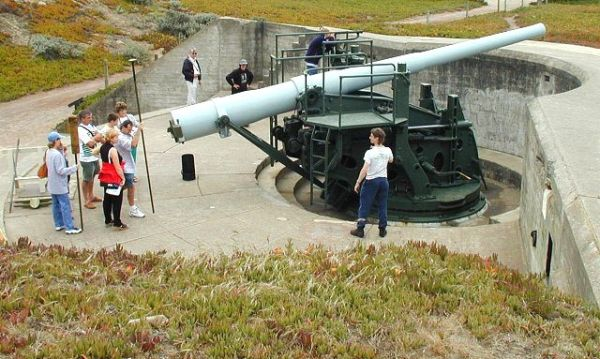
6-inch (152 mm) disappearing gun at Battery Chamberlin, Presidio of San Francisco, similar to guns at Batteries Acker and Bayard, Forts McKinley and Lyon.

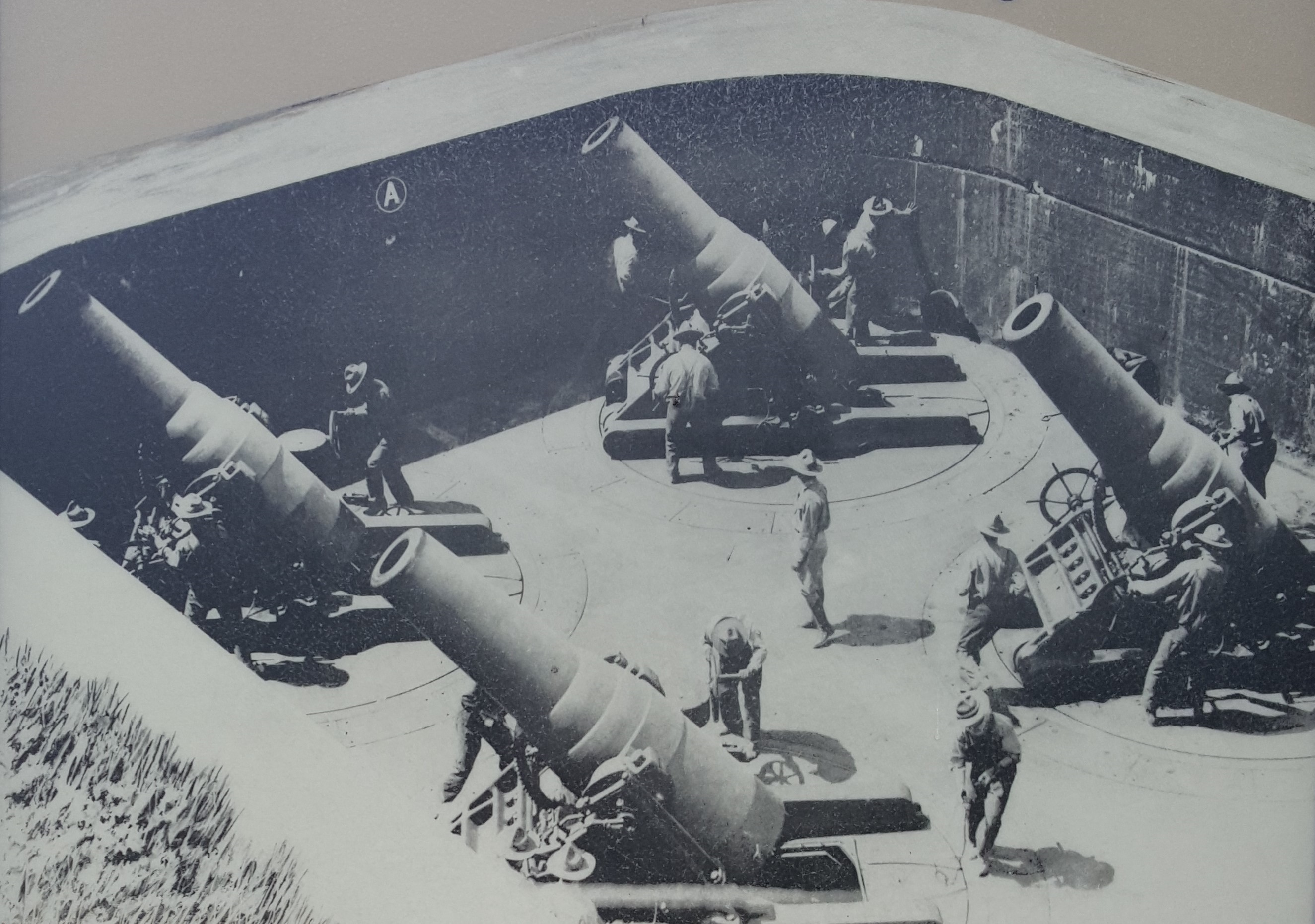
12-inch (305 mm) mortars in a pit, similar to Battery Ingalls.

Fort McKinley was completed by 1906 with nine gun batteries as follows:

North Fork:

Name	No. of guns	Gun type	Carriage type	Years active
Ingalls	8	12-inch (305 mm) mortar M1890	barbette M1896	1904-1942
Berry	2	12-inch (305 mm) gun M1888	disappearing M1896	1901-1943
Thompson	3	8-inch (203 mm) gun M1888	disappearing M1896	1902-1942
Acker	2	6-inch (152 mm) gun M1897	disappearing M1898	1902-1943
Farry	2	3-inch (76 mm) gun M1898	masking parapet M1898	1902-1920

South Fork:

Name	No. of guns	Gun type	Carriage type	Years active
Weymouth	3	8-inch (203 mm) gun M1888	disappearing M1896	1901-1942
Honeycutt	2	8-inch (203 mm) gun M1888	disappearing M1896	1901-1942
Carpenter	2	6-inch (152 mm) gun M1900	pedestal M1900	1906-1917, 1919-1947
Ramsay	2	3-inch (76 mm) gun M1898	masking parapet M1898	1902-1920

Fort Lyon was completed by 1909 with two gun batteries as follows:

Name	No. of guns	Gun type	Carriage type	Years active
Bayard	3	6-inch (152 mm) gun M1903	disappearing M1903	1907-1917
Abbot	3	3-inch (76 mm) gun M1903	pedestal M1903	1909-1946

At Fort McKinley, facilities supporting an underwater minefield were built on the South Fork and at Fort Lyon; the 3-inch guns at both forts were intended to defend the minefield against minesweepers. Construction of the original barracks and administration buildings at Fort McKinley began in 1902-1903 and lasted through 1906. This construction phase was sized for four companies. Four 109-man barracks were constructed along with four sets of duplex Non-Commissioned Officers' (NCO) quarters, six sets of duplex officers' quarters, three sets of single family officers' quarters and various administration and support buildings to accommodate a post of this size.

A few buildings were built between 1905 and 1908, and a significant expansion to accommodate seven companies began in 1908-1909 and was largely complete by the end of 1910. The expansion included two additional barracks, one of which was a double barracks, four more sets of duplex NCO quarters and a ten-man Bachelor Officers' Quarters (BOQ). At this point, the fort had the capacity for 17 officers, 18 married NCOs, and 788 enlisted men. The existing hospital and guardhouse were expanded in 1910 to accommodate the increased population.

=== World War I ===
During World War I, the forts were manned by artillery companies of the Coast Artillery Corps and Maine National Guard troops. After the American entry into World War I in 1917, the forts were partially disarmed so the guns could be shipped to the Western Front in France. Four of the eight mortars of Battery Ingalls were removed for conversion to railway artillery. This was done with most mortar batteries; with four mortars in each pit the reloading time was excessive due to crowding of men and equipment. So, mortars were removed to leave two mortars per pit. The mortars were not shipped to France; most railway mortars remained in reserve through World War II. Some of Fort McKinley's 8-inch (203 mm) guns were dismounted for railway conversion, but never left the fort and were later remounted. The two 6-inch (152 mm) guns of Battery Carpenter and Fort Lyon's three six-inch guns were removed to be mounted on field carriages; all were shipped to France and later returned to the United States, with Battery Carpenter's guns returning to Fort McKinley. The Fort Lyon guns were eventually used elsewhere on new mountings in World War II. A history of the Coast Artillery in World War I states that none of the regiments in France equipped with 6-inch guns completed training in time to see action before the Armistice.

In 1920 Fort McKinley lost both of its 3-inch gun batteries due to obsolescence; this was part of a general removal of all Driggs-Seabury 3-inch (76 mm) gun M1898 and their unique masking parapet mountings from service. The masking parapet mount was a simple form of disappearing mount; on 3-inch guns it could not be retracted in action and was locked in the up position after a few years in service.

=== Interwar period ===
By early 1922, coast artillery at Fort McKinley was in a caretaker status. Elements of the 5th Infantry Regiment (United States) were stationed at Fort McKinley from 1922 until 1939.

An infantry Citizens' Military Training Camp was held at Fort McKinley between 1925 and 1940 and was declared "the best camp in the United States" by Army Chief of Staff, General Charles P. Summerall in 1929.

=== World War II ===
In 1940-1941 both forts were expanded to deal with the influx of draftees; a draft was instituted shortly after the outbreak of World War II in Europe in September 1939 and the National Guard was mobilized, which included Coast Artillery Corps units. Construction at Fort McKinley added six temporary enlisted barracks, one temporary officers' barracks, two mess halls, two administration buildings and two recreation buildings. This increased the post capacity to 62 officers, 18 married NCOs, 1438 enlisted men and 25 animals in Jun 1941. In late 1941 Fort Lyon added three new temporary buildings, a wharf, and utilities to house 130 enlisted men and 6 officers. The three buildings included a 172-man mess hall, a 74-man enlisted barracks and a modified barracks to house 56 enlisted men and 6 officers. An antiaircraft battery was also deployed there. At this time the major units garrisoning the Harbor Defenses of Portland were the 8th Coast Artillery Regiment of the Regular Army and the 240th Coast Artillery (United States) Regiment of the Maine National Guard. However, most guns of the two forts would soon be removed and scrapped. A modernization centered on Battery Steele on Peaks Island was implemented, and by the end of 1943 all guns and mortars had been removed from both forts, except the two 6-inch (152 mm) guns at Battery Carpenter and three 3-inch (76 mm) guns at Battery Abbot.

Following the Italian armistice with the Allies in September 1943, the Armistice of Cassibile, Italian submariners helped train Allied Anti-submarine warfare units off the east coast of the United States. The submarines Vortice, Morea, and Funino were assigned to Portland, Maine and the crew of the Vortice was billeted at the U.S. Navy's Casco Bay Receiving Station on Fort McKinley. According to an oral history stored at the Library of Congress, Dr. Henry Heimlich was stationed for a short time at the Casco Bay Receiving Station during World War II.

With little threat to the East Coast from surface ships by 1944, the coast defenses were drawn down and the Coast Artillery regiments reduced to battalions or their personnel reassigned. Shortly after the war the Army withdrew from Forts McKinley and Lyon and the properties were sold or transferred.

== Present ==
2026 view of officers' housing constructed in the early 20th century on the parade ground at Fort McKinley, Maine.

Fort McKinley has been redeveloped as a gated community named Diamond Cove. Most of the batteries are heavily overgrown and all are on private property. Cow Island was redeveloped beginning in 2000 as a camp for environmental, adventure, and leadership development programs.

== See also ==
- Casco Bay
- Port of Portland (Maine)
- Seacoast defense in the United States
- United States Army Coast Artillery Corps
- List of coastal fortifications of the United States
- Harbor Defenses of Portland
- National Register of Historic Places listings in Cumberland County, Maine
