= Casco Bay Mail Boat =

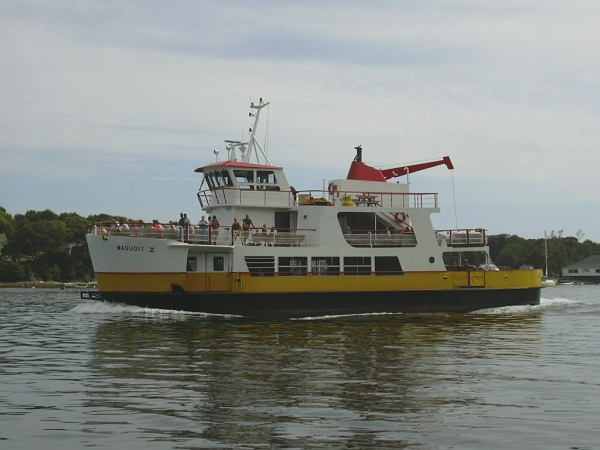
- The Maquoit II passing Peaks Island, 2006

History

United States
- Name: Maquoit II
- Owner: Casco Bay Lines
- Operator: Casco Bay Lines
- Route: Portland – Little Diamond Island – Great Diamond Island – Long Island – Cliff Island – Great Chebeague Island
- Status: Operational

General characteristics
- Type: Mail boat

The Casco Bay Mail Boat is a sailing vessel, run by Casco Bay Lines, which delivers mail and other items to the residents of the islands of Casco Bay in Maine, United States. It is the longest-running mail boat service in the country, having been in existence since the 1870s. Up until the 1950s, the boat was coal-powered; now it runs on a diesel engine.

Currently undertaken by the Maquoit II, one of Casco Bay Lines' three mail boats, the service runs twice daily. The route takes around three hours and visits five islands: Little Diamond Island, Great Diamond Island, Long Island, Great Chebeague Island and Cliff Island.

Passengers are permitted on the boat, and tourists can alight at Long Island, Great Chebeague Island and Cliff Island; the Diamonds, meanwhile, are private, with no public beaches, facilities or restaurants. If there are ten or more passengers, a route narration is provided. The route takes the boat beside landmarks such as Fort Gorges and Luckse Sound, where ships were torpedoed during World War II.

The mail boat is based at the Maine State Pier and departs at 10.00 AM and 2.15 PM.

== See also ==
- Public transportation in Maine
