= Diamond Island =

Diamond Island may refer to:

== Islands ==
- Diamond Island (Myanmar)
- Diamond Island (Cambodia), an island in the Mekong river
- Diamond Island (Grenadines)
- Diamond Island (Tasmania)
- Diamond Island (Kentucky)
- Diamond Island (New York), an island on Lake George (New York)
- Diamond Island (Montana), an island in the Yellowstone River
- Diamond Island (Tennessee)
- Diamond Island (Vermont), an island in Lake Champlain

== Other uses ==
- Diamond Island (film), 2016

== See also ==
- Great Diamond Island, Maine
- Little Diamond Island, Maine
- Diamond Rock, Martinique, a basalt island
