= Great Chebeague Golf Club =

- U.S. National Register of Historic Places
- U.S. Historic district
- Location within Maine Location within the United States
- Location: 16 Stone Wharf Rd., Chebeague Island, Maine
- Coordinates: 43°45′2″N 70°6′21″W
- Area: 28.7 acres (11.6 ha)
- Architectural style: Early Republic
- NRHP reference No.: 15000416
- Added to NRHP: July 14, 2015

The Great Chebeague Golf Club is a country club at 16 Stone Wharf Road on Chebeague Island, Maine. It has a nine-hole golf course on more than 28 acres (11 ha) on the north side of the island. Its clubhouse is a repurposed circa 1807 residence, which is probably one of the oldest buildings used for that purpose in the nation. The club was listed on the National Register of Historic Places in 2015.

== Description and history ==
Great Chebeague Island is an island community, set on the eponymous island in Casco Bay, not far from the town of Yarmouth, of which the island is a part. The Great Chebeague Golf Club (GCGC) is located on the west side of the northern tip of the island, and is divided into two large parts by Stone Wharf Road, the principal access to a wharf serving the ferry to Cousins Island. The golf course has nine holes, and was laid out in the 1920s. It has retained features common to golf courses of that period, including narrow fairways and small greens. Portions of holes 1, 2, 4 and 5 are located north of Stone Wharf Road, overlooked by the Chebeague Island Inn, while the rest of the course, and the clubhouse, are located to its south.

The clubhouse is a c. 1807 (or possibly even older) 1-1/2 story wood frame Cape that was originally located roughly where the third fairway is. It was moved to its present, more central location in the property on a rocky outcrop, in 1928, and adorned with a wraparound porch in 1935. Despite its alteration for use as a clubhouse, the interior of the building retains a number of period features, including wide floorboards and fireplace mantels. Historical documentation and island oral histories place construction of the house at sometime between 1790 and 1807. Adjacent to the clubhouse is the small cemetery of the Keazer and Chandler families, which has four early 19th-century headstones.

Great Chebeague Island, the largest island in Casco Bay, was for much of the 19th century a home for workers in Maine's economically important granite trade, its residents working on ships that transported stone from nearby quarries all over the east coast of the United States. With the advent of steam propulsion, this business declined, and the island became a seaside resort community, visited by people from cities further south. Founded in 1920 (as a six-hole course), the GCGC was a significant element of the popularization of golf in the area.

== See also ==
- National Register of Historic Places listings in Cumberland County, Maine
