= Luckse Sound =

Body of water in southern Maine, U.S.

- Luckse Sound, viewed from Cliff Island

- Location within the United States
- Coordinates: 43.700454°N 70.115540°W
- Type: sound
- Part of: Casco Bay

Luckse Sound is a sound in Casco Bay, Maine, United States. Located between Long Island and Cliff Island, it is one of the deepest channels which separate inner Casco Bay from its outlying waters in the Gulf of Maine, after Portland Channel, Hussey Sound and Broad Sound.

Ships were torpedoed in the sound during World War II.

Today, the Casco Bay Mailboat passes through the sound.
