= Cow Island, Maine =

Island in Cumberland County, Maine, United States

Coordinates: 43°41′30″N 70°11′10″W

Cow Island is a 26-acre (11 ha) island in Casco Bay, Maine, United States, off Great Diamond Island, about 3 miles (4.8 km) northeast of downtown Portland, and is part of the Town of Long Island in Cumberland County.

A non-profit organization called Rippleffect bought Cow Island in 2005 for $625,000, where it runs leadership development programs for youth and adults. Under a permanent conservation easement created by prior owner Maine Coast Heritage Trust as a condition of the sale, public access is allowed on a stretch of the northern shore, with that land included as a stop of the Maine Island Trail.

== History ==
The Cow Island name is thought to be derived from the colonial-era practice of keeping livestock on small islands during grazing season, an easy method to keep them corraled.

With the 1873 establishment of Fort McKinley on Great Diamond, the U.S. government purchased Cow Island for greater coverage of the Hussey Sound approach to Portland Harbor.

Fort Lyon was named for Nathaniel Lyon, the first Union general to be killed in the American Civil War. Work did not begin until 1900 with initial land clearing, and foundations were poured in 1903 for a trio of three-inch guns that would not be mounted until 1909 as Battery Abbot, named for Union officer Edward Stanley Abbot who died of wounds sustained in the Battle of Gettysburg.

In August 1903, the U.S. military staged a military exercise in Casco Bay as the Navy developed strategies for warships to assault fortified harbors like Portland, and with the U.S. Army testing its ability to defend shore installations including Cow Island.

The Army approved a second battery of three, six-inch guns for Fort Lyon, which were emplaced on the southeastern side of the island. The battery was named for George Dashiell Bayard, a Union general who died of wounds incurred in the Battle of Fredericksburg.

During World War II, Fort Lyon was again garrisoned with a coastal artillery company tasked with defending Hussey Sound from minesweepers or other incursions, with antisubmarine netting stretching across the sound with a gate to let authorized vessels enter or depart the inner bay.

In 1948, the federal War Assets Administration put multiple island military reservations up for sale in Casco Bay, including Cow Island, Great Diamond Island and Little Chebeague Island, with veterans given priority for any purchases.

While entering the inner bay via Hussey Sound in July 1972, the Wilh. Wilhelmsen tanker Tamano struck Soldier Ledge. Tamano continued to an anchorage between Long Island and Clapboard Island before the crew discovered a tank had been pierced. About 100,000 gallons of No. 6 fuel oil spilled into Casco Bay, with Cow Island among the islands with shorelines contaminated by oil.

Vestiges of Fort Lyon's concrete works remain on Cow Island today, including a large pill-box near the center and two underground tunnels below it that appear to have been used to store ammunition and supplies.

Cow Island Ledge is located north of the island with Cow Island Ledge Light serving as a navigational beacon there.

== See also ==
- List of islands of Maine
