= Casco Bay Lines =

Publicly run transportation company in Maine, US

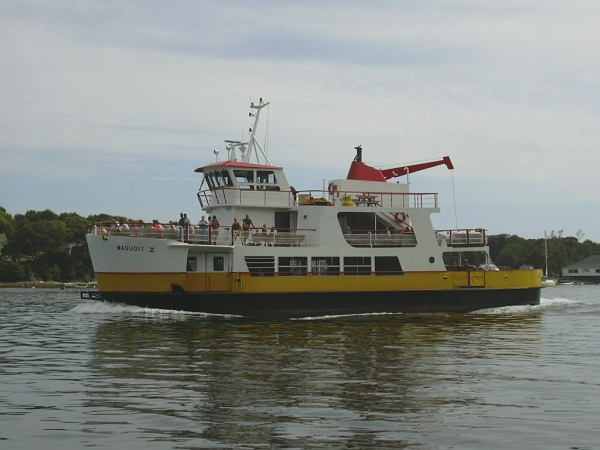
- The Casco Bay Lines ferry Maquoit II passing Peaks Island on the Casco Bay Mailboat run down the bay
- Company type: Public
- Industry: Transportation
- Founded: 1919 (107 years ago)
- Headquarters: Portland, Maine, U.S.
- Website: www.cascobaylines.com

Casco Bay Lines (also known as the Casco Bay Island Transit District; abbreviated to CBITD) is a publicly run transportation company that services the residents of the islands of Casco Bay, Maine. The seven islands are Peaks Island, Little Diamond Island, Great Diamond Island, Diamond Cove, Long Island, Chebeague Island and Cliff Island.

The company has a fleet of five vessels. Schedules to the islands vary seasonally. During the summer months, more frequent trips serve the islands, while there are significantly fewer trips during the winter.

== History ==
The Casco Bay Steamboat Company began providing permanent year-round service to Casco Bay Islands in 1878. In 1881, the Harpswell Line began providing regular service to the outer bay islands. The lines merged in 1907 as the Casco Bay and Harpswell Steamboat Company. The company shut down in July 1919 as a direct result of World War I. A smaller company named Casco Bay Lines was formed that winter.

CBITD is a non-profit organization that was established through emergency State legislation in 1981. CBITD acquired CBL assets through bankruptcy proceedings to ensure the continuation of transportation service between their primary terminal hub in Portland, Maine, and the islands of Casco Bay. CBITD is governed by a board of twelve directors, ten of whom are elected from the island communities. One is appointed by the City of Portland; another is appointed by the Commissioner of the Maine Department of Transportation.

Many workers from the island communities depend on CBITD to get them to work every day and to take them home. All school children who live on the islands have to use CBITD service to get back and forth to school (this applies to sixth grade and up.) There is a car ferry that services Peaks Island and a freight ferry that services all of the "down bay" islands, including Long Island, Chebeague Island and Cliff Island.

The signature color patterns of the Casco Bay Lines fleet is (from bottom up): black, yellow, white and red. Casco Bay Lines was once located at Custom House Wharf but was moved in the 1980s to its current location on the Maine State Pier, at the former Franklin Street wharf. When the company was first established it used steamboats to transport its cargo. Some of the more famous steamboats included the Aucocisco, Maquoit and Machigonne. Its first ferry was the Abenaki, which operated on Casco Bay for nearly five decades.

The Portland Ferry terminal received a substantial renovation and addition in 2014 designed by Scott Simons Architects.

== Routes ==
Each of the seven islands on the roster of Casco Bay Lines is served seven days a week, with frequency dependent upon the season.

The Peaks Island ferry (aboard the Machigonne II) runs fifteen times on Mondays and Tuesdays, and sixteen times on Wednesdays through Sundays, with a layover of thirty minutes after reaching the island. The last ferry departs Peaks at either 10:55 PM (Mondays and Tuesdays) or 11:55 PM (Wednesdays to Sundays). Vehicles are permitted on the ferry only at certain times on Mondays and Tuesdays but there are no restrictions for the rest of the week. In 2024, CBITD voted in favor of an 82% fare increase on the Peaks Island service for non-residents of the island.

The year-round Casco Bay Mail Boat run (aboard the Maquoit II) stops at five islands three times a day: Little Diamond, Great Diamond, Long Island, Cliff Island and Chebeague Island, on a route that takes around three hours. It is the longest-running mailboat service in the country, having been in existence since the 1870s. Up until the 1950s, the boat was coal-powered; now it runs on a diesel engine.

The Wabanaki and Maquoit II share the running of the route, beginning at 5.00 AM each day in the high season. The last of the eight sailings leaves Portland at 9.15 PM. The Wabanaki runs each service from 3.00 PM onward.

The Sunrise Run departs daily at 5.00 AM and takes around 2.5 hours. The Diamond Pass Run departs daily at 1.00 PM and takes around two hours and passes Little Diamond Island, Great Diamond Island and Peaks Island. The Sunset Run departs at 5.45 PM and takes around three hours.

== Fleet ==
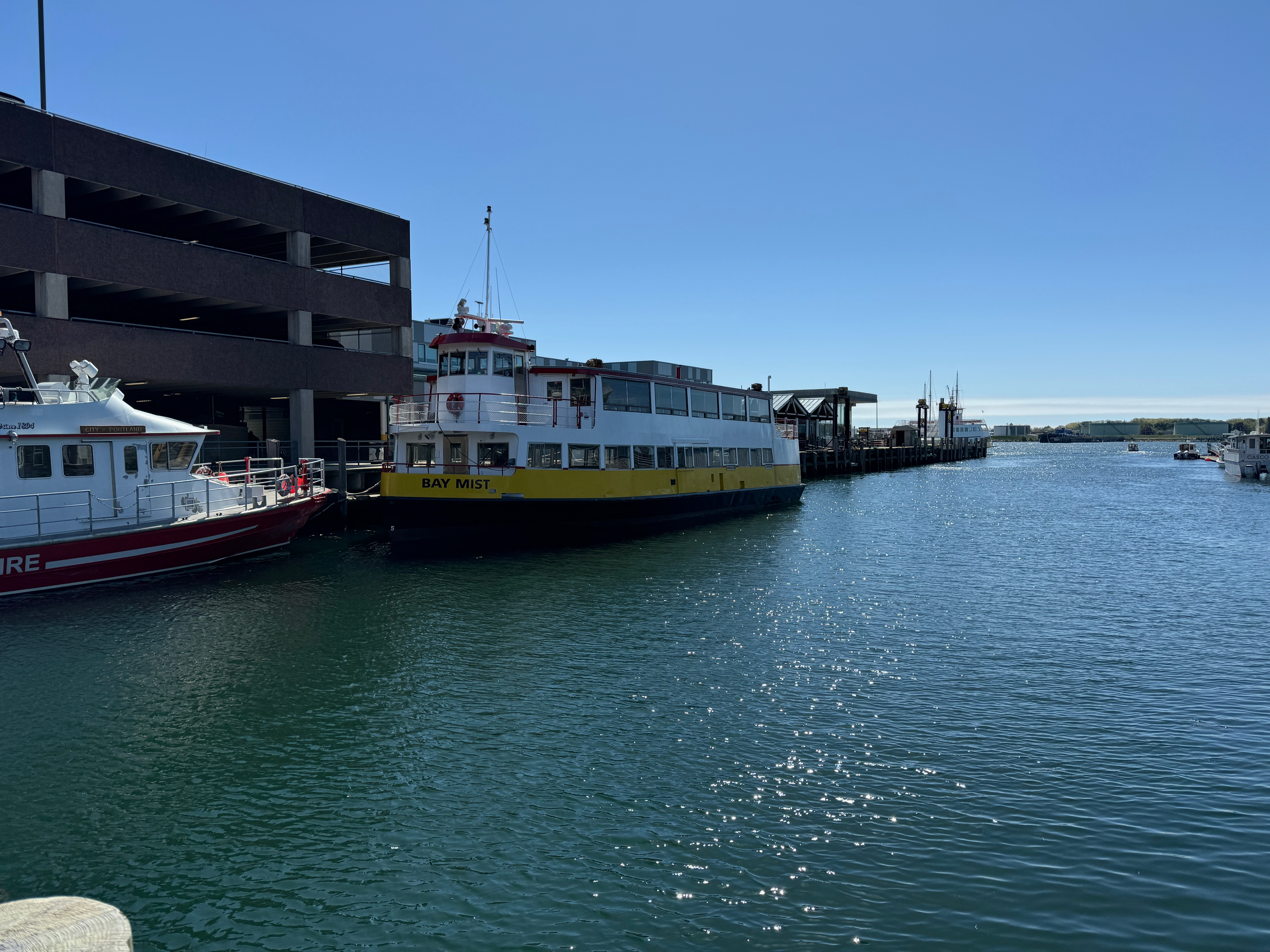
Bay Mist, the oldest vessel in the fleet

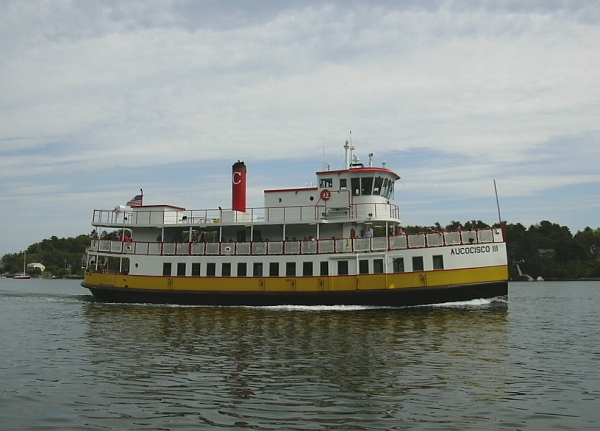
One of the newer ferries in the Casco Bay Lines fleet, the Aucocisco III, which replaced the Island Holiday in 2006.

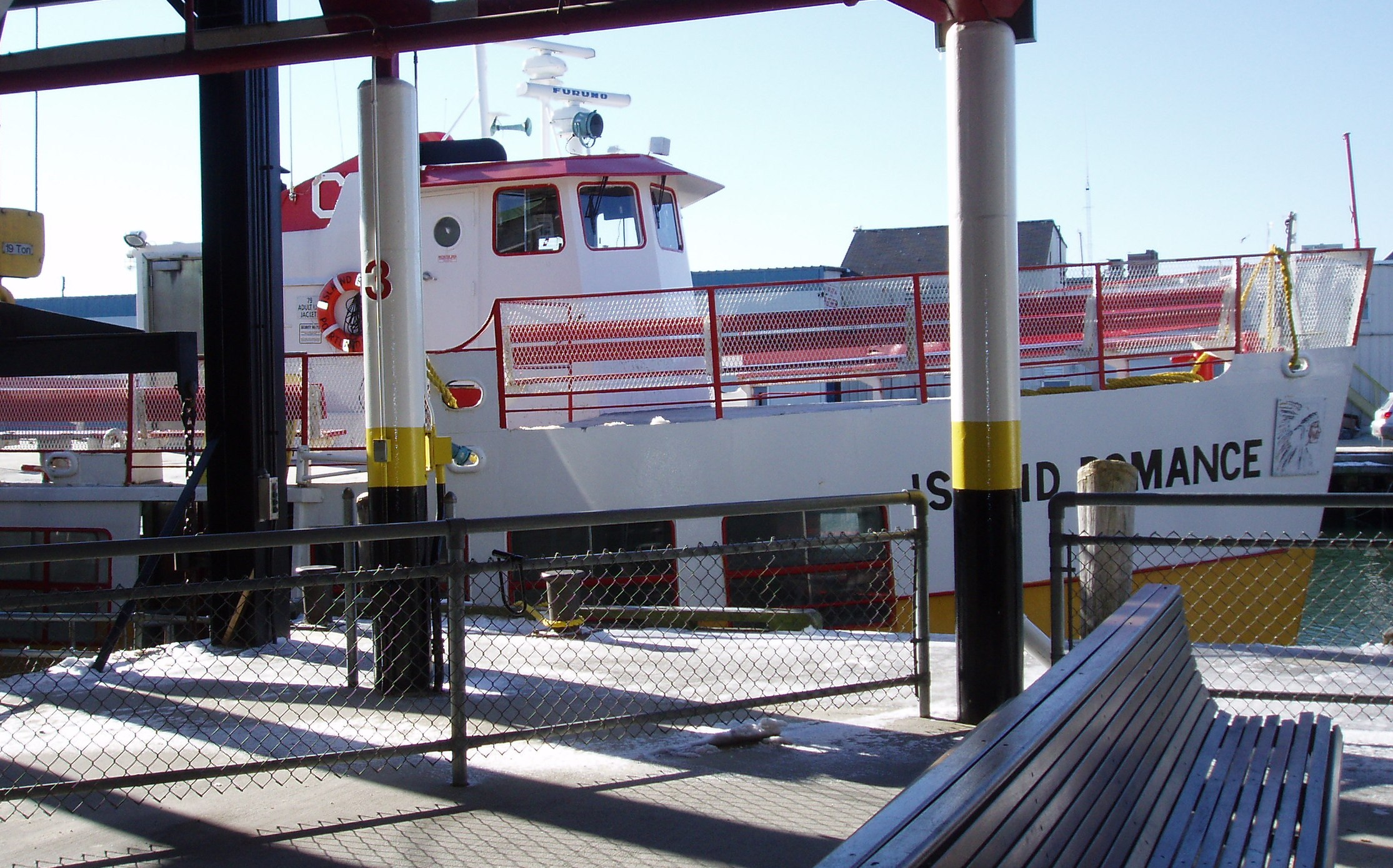
Casco Bay Lines' Island Romance ferry docked in Portland

As of 2024, there are five vessels in Casco Bay Lines' fleet:

- Bay Mist (built in 1985)
- Machigonne II (built in 1987)
- Maquoit II (the Casco Bay Mail Boat; built in 1994)
- Aucocisco III (built in 2005)
- Wabanaki (built in 2013)

=== Retired vessels ===
- Cadet Merrycneag Longfellow
- Machigonne
- Maquoit
- Quickwater
- Abenaki (now a charter boat on the Hudson River in New York City named Half Moon)
- Aucocisco
- Aucocisco II (last operated as the Silver Star in Essex, Connecticut. Scrapped in 2007)
- Emita II (sold first as a canal boat on the Erie Canal and again sold in 2018 to Harbor Country Adventures in New Buffalo, Michigan)
- Sunshine
- Gurnet
- Berkley
- Island Adventure (now tour boat Cosmo, operating in New York City)
- Island Romance (sold in late 2014 to El Dorado Cruise LLC, Staten Island, New York)
- Rebel
- Island Holiday (sold in 2006 to Chattanooga Water Taxi, LLC; renamed Fat Cat)
- Narmarda
- Admiral
- Tourist
- Sabino (now a tour boat at Mystic Seaport in Mystic, Connecticut)
- Emita
- Joan
- Edward B.
- Sebascodegan
- Pilgrim
- Nellie G. III (formerly captained by Archie Ross)

=== Future expansion ===
Casco Bay Lines is undergoing a Fleet Evaluation project, which aims to replace the aging Machigonne II. The new vessel, which is currently under construction by Senesco Marine of Rhode Island, will feature a hybrid-electric engine, a first for CBL's fleet.

== Terminal ==
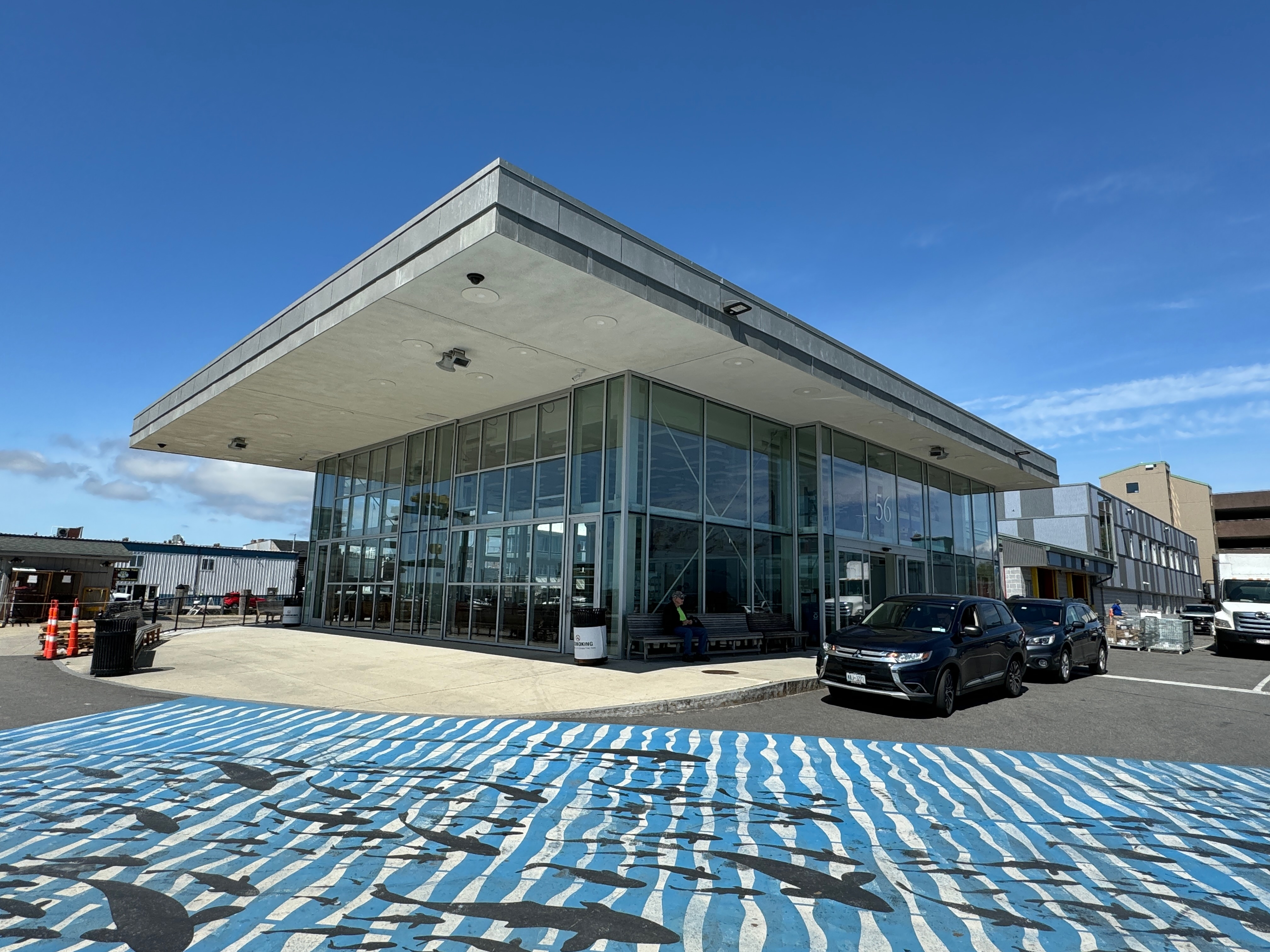
Casco Bay Lines' terminal building on the Maine State Pier

The Casco Bay Lines Ferry Terminal is located on the Maine State Pier. It was constructed in the 1980s. In the summer of 2014, a major renovation and addition designed by Scott Simons Architects opened to the public, effectively doubling the size of the original building. The new terminal received an Honorable Mention at the American Institute of Architects' (AIA) New England Design 2014 Design Awards and an AIA Maine Honor Award in 2016.

== See also ==
- Public transportation in Maine
