= Cow Island =

Cow Island may refer to:

- Cow Island, Louisiana
- Cow Island, Maine
- Cow Island, Montana
- Cow Island, Ontario

== See also ==
- Île-à-Vache (Vache is cow in French), Haiti
- Île aux Vaches in the Hochelaga Archipelago, Quebec
- Île aux Vaches on the Seine river in France, that later formed part of Île Saint-Louis
- Sea Cow Island, Chagos Archipelago
- Vache Island, Seychelles
