= Bangs Island, Broad Sound =

Island in Maine, United States

Coordinates: 43°43′38″N 70°05′26″W

Bangs Island is a Casco Bay island that is part of the town of Chebeague Island in Maine. Bangs Island is owned by the state of Maine and is kept open to the public for day visits and overnight camping.

== Geography ==
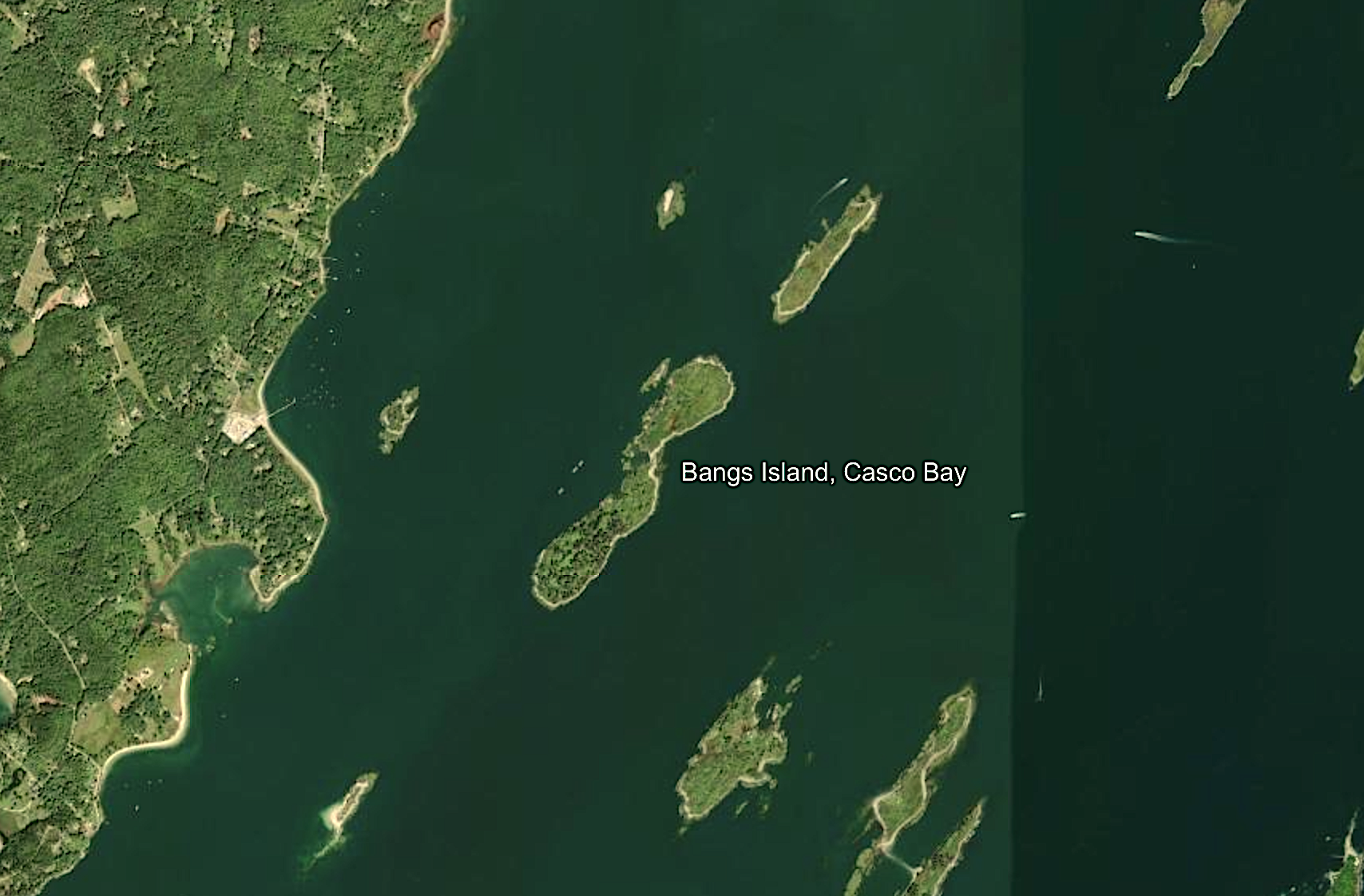
A U.S. Geological Survey satellite image of Bangs Island.

Bangs Island is located in Broad Sound east of Great Chebeague Island. Bangs Island is roughly one mile in length and totals 55 acres of land.

== History ==
Bangs Island was the original name of Cushing Island off Cape Elizabeth, Maine, after Joshua Bangs who purchased it in 1735. The Bangs Island name stuck into the 18th century, until its sale and subsequent adoption of the Cushing Island name. As of 1832, present-day Bangs Island was known as Lower Bangs Island.

Present-day Bangs Island had a year-round settlement by the 19th century. Over the course of the century, the island was cleared of trees and used to pasture sheep or cattle, as late as 1890. Drill holes that have been observed in rock along the Bangs Island shore suggest "rock slooping", a practice in which explosive charges were used to harvest rubble for use in coastal construction of breakwaters and wharves. With discontinued use of the island in the 20th century for agricultural purposes, trees reestablished on Bangs Island.

Bangs Island was added to the Maine Island Trail in 2004.

In July 2007, the state of Maine approved the incorporation of the Town of Chebeague Island, including Great Chebeague, Bangs Island and 13 other islands in their entirety, and portions of two more.

The state of Maine has issued multiple leases for aquaculture operations in the immediate vicinity of Bangs Island. In 2010, the founders of Bangs Island Mussels used the island as their brand, producing about 600,000 pounds of mussels annually.

The Town of Chebeague Island listed an appraised value for Bangs Island at $136,000 as of 2017.
