= Little Chebeague Island =

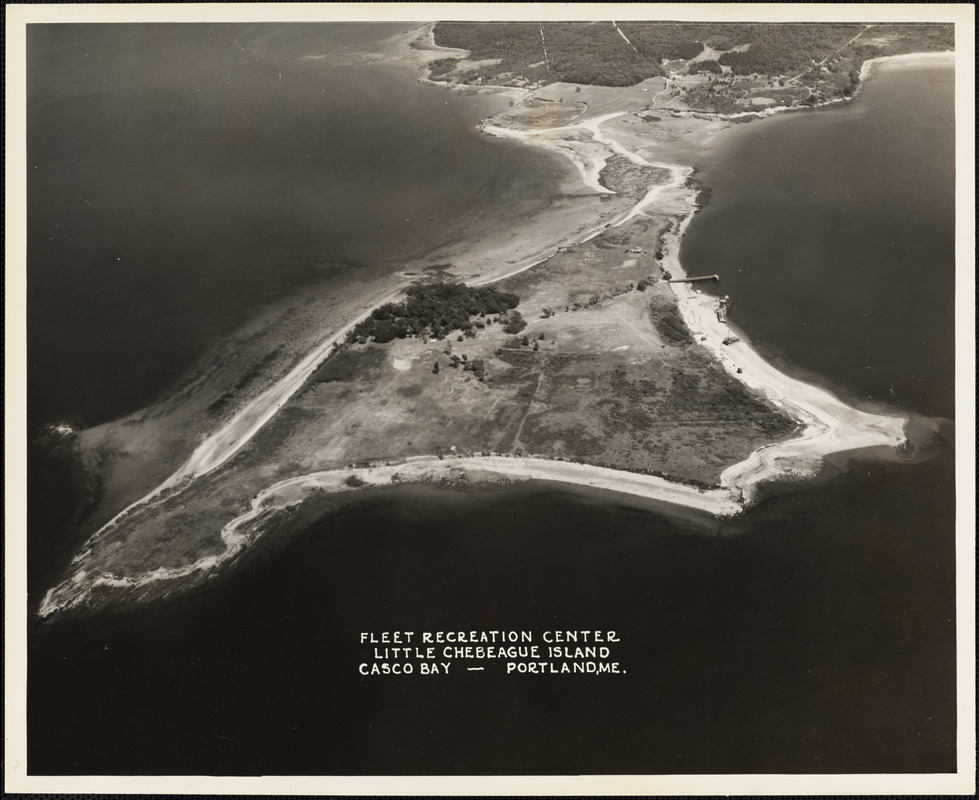
- Little Chebeague Island in 1947, looking east to Great Chebeague Island

- Location in Cumberland County and the state of Maine.
- Coordinates: 43.712137°N 70.148442°W
- Country: United States
- State: Maine
- County: Cumberland

Area
  - Total: 0.13 sq mi (0.34 km^{2})

Population
  - Total: 0
- Time zone: UTC-5 (Eastern (EST))
  - Summer (DST): UTC-4 (EDT)

Little Chebeague Island is an uninhabited island in Casco Bay, an open bay of the Gulf of Maine, United States. It is located around 0.85 miles (1.37 km) west of the southern tip of the larger Great Chebeague Island. As its name implies, the two are connected—by a sand bar which appears at low tide.

The island, which was the home of the Wabanaki people, is co-managed by the Maine Bureau of Parks and Lands (BPL) and the Maine Island Trail Association (MITA) as an undeveloped park where picnicking, camping and swimming are permitted.

Being that there are many fresh-water underground springs and rivulets, low-tide exposed sandy areas, such as the sandbar or coves, often have "quicksand" zones that must be noted with caution. The island, which is approximately 0.75 miles (1.21 km) long (east to west) and 0.40 miles (0.64 km) wide (north to south), with 86 acres (35 ha) of land, is mostly dense shrub and forest, having been allowed to grow wild between the end of World War II and the late 20th century.

The island now contains around 1.5 miles (2.4 km) of hiking trails, which pass the remains of several former summer cottages.

== History ==
Despite the resistance of some residents, the island was taken over by the United States Navy in 1943, midway through World War II. It was used during the war as the Fire Fighters School of the Portland Naval Training Center. Recreational facilities were built, including ball fields, a boxing ring, a skeet range and a music hall.

In 1866, Abraham Osgood Jr. (1783–1872) completed the building of the island's only known hotel. Built in the northeastern corner of the island, it was named Sunnyside House.

In the late 19th century, the island was purchased by stockholders who foresaw its tourism potential. They formed the Little Chebeague Island Company and renamed the hotel The Waldo. The hotel burned down in 1893, when its proprietor was Sidney M. Sea, due to the remnant of a firework. It was not rebuilt.

John B. Absmeier purchased the island in 1951 to use it for organic farming. He attempted to keep the island's many invasive plants at bay, but ultimately failed to do so. He stopped visiting the island and died in 1971.

In 1972, the Maine Bureau of Parks and Lands purchased the island for $155,000, with the plan to keep it as undeveloped public land.

Fifteen years later, in 1987, after personnel from Portland High School marked out potential passable routes around the island, along with identifying the hotel and several former cottage sites, Little Chebeague was added to the Maine Island Trail roster. The Maine Island Trail Association (MITA), in partnership with the State of Maine, agreed to maintain the island's campsites and its shoreline.

Richard Innes (1922–2020), a dedicated volunteer, began work to clear the island's trails in 1990. During the next sixteen years, he installed signs informing visitors of the several points of interest. Innes, who also completed a history of Little Chebeague Island in 2002, died in 2020, aged 97. In 2010, he had been succeeded in his role on Little Chebeague by Erno Bonebakker.

The Little Chebeague Island Caretaker Program was established in 2014, allowing a caretaker to live on the island during the high season to oversee its recreational use.

In 2001, MITA received a grant from Maine's Recreational Trails Program (RTP) to build a privy for campers and visitors to the island. It was erected in the southeastern section of the island. In 2023, a second one was being constructed in its northeastern corner, near the entrance to the island from the sand bar. Work against the island's invasive plants is ongoing.

== Gallery ==
The island's Waldo Hotel, which burned down in 1893

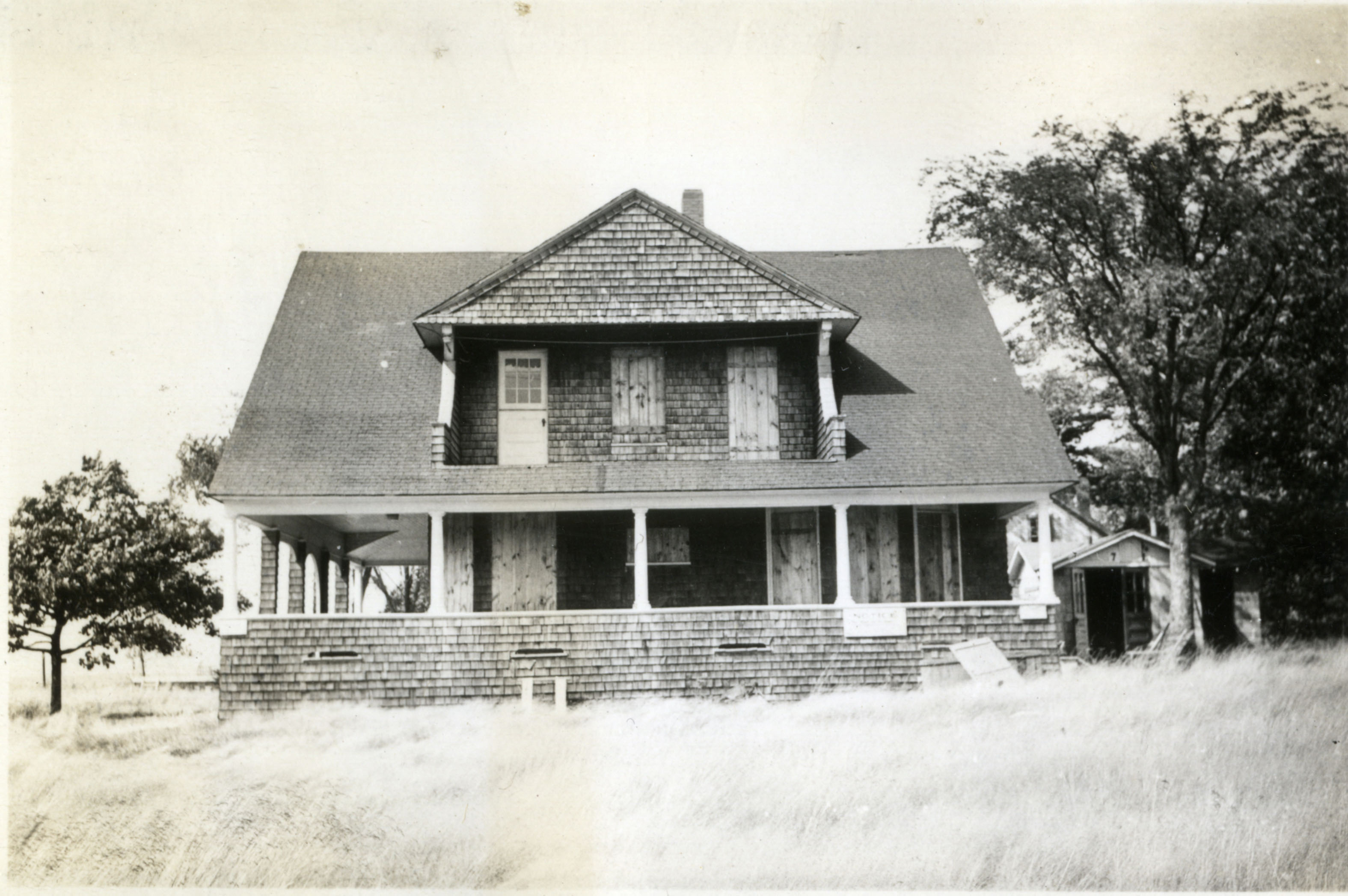
The now-demolished Recreation Building, pictured in 1947, which was one of several buildings that stood on the island during World War II

== See also ==
- List of islands of Maine
