= Crown Pilot Crackers =

- Type: Cracker
- Place of origin: United States
- Region or state: New England
- Created by: John Pearson

Crown Pilot was a brand of cracker popular in much of New England in the United States. It was manufactured by Nabisco (a subsidiary of Kraft Foods as of 2000) until it was discontinued in the first quarter of 2008. The cracker was unsalted, and closely related to hardtack. The crackers were an important ingredient in historical recipes of clam chowder and a staple in many New England pantries.

== History ==
The Crown Pilot cracker is Nabisco's oldest recipe, which was acquired with their purchase of a bakery in Newburyport, Massachusetts. The recipe was originally created by John Pearson of Newburyport in 1792 for producing seagoing biscuits.

The cracker was discontinued once before in 1996 by Nabisco. This sparked the publicized protests of Donna Damon on Chebeague Island and Maine humorist Tim Sample, which eventually led to an episode of CBS News Sunday Morning with Charles Osgood covering the events. The story was picked up by the AP who used Damon's son as a poster boy for the movement and was eventually published more than three hundred times in all 50 states. . Shortly after this, the company resumed production in 1997 after complaints.

Production of Crown Pilot crackers was ended again by Kraft in 2008, reportedly due to drops in the sales of the product since the 1990s. According to the Kraft spokeswoman, Laurie Guzzinati, demand for the crackers was half of what it was 12 years earlier, with about 241,000 pounds sold in 1996.

The crackers were an important ingredient in many New England recipes for seafood stuffings, chowders, and soups, as well as in many recipes of the Canadian Maritimes and Newfoundland and Labrador including fish and brewis.

The crackers closest replacement readily available in New England supermarkets is the Jacobs Cream Cracker, originally an Irish product currently made in Ashby-de-la-Zouch, Leicestershire, UK.
