= Great Diamond Island Site =

- Maine Archeological Site No. 9-16
- U.S. National Register of Historic Places
- Location: Great Diamond Island, Portland, Maine
- Area: 1.3 acres (0.53 ha)
- NRHP reference No.: 79000141
- Added to NRHP: May 7, 1979

The Great Diamond Island Site, designated Site 9-16 by the Maine Archaeological Survey, is a prehistoric archaeological site on Great Diamond Island in Casco Bay, off the coast of southern Maine. Principally a shell midden, the site is an important window into the habitation and usage history of the Casco Bay region by Native Americans. The site was listed on the National Register of Historic Places in 1979.

== Description ==
Great Diamond Island is one of the inner islands of Casco Bay, located about 2 miles (3.2 km) east of the Portland peninsula. The island is administratively part of the city, and was for many years the site of Fort McKinley.

Site 9-16 is primarily a shell midden located on the island. The site also includes a number of subsurface pit features, which are interpreted as either storage or cooking sites. One human burial was also found.

Finds at the site include a wide variety of fish bones, most of which were Atlantic cod. This apparently distinguishes the site as primarily a fishing station; by comparison, a site on Moshier Island had a large number of faunal remains, principally deer. The site also includes a significant number of both stone tools and the debitage that results from their manufacture, suggesting extended seasonal occupation. Pottery fragments found at the site have been dated between 300 BCE and 1200 CE.

== See also ==
- National Register of Historic Places listings in Portland, Maine
