= Hope Island (Maine) =

Island in Cumberland County, Maine, United States

- Interactive map of Hope Island (Maine)

Geography
- Location: Casco Bay
- Coordinates: 43.755°N 70.100°W

Administration
- United States

Hope Island is a privately owned island in Casco Bay near the city of Portland, Maine, United States. It is a part of the Town of Chebeague Island, in Cumberland County. The 89-acre (36 ha) island was considered for an LNG terminal. Developer John Cacoulidis and his wife Phyllis bought the island in 1993. In addition to the existing 10,000 sq. ft. house built in 1913 with nine bedrooms, seven bathrooms and five fireplaces, the Cacoulidises built there a separate 3,300-square-foot guest house, a boathouse with an apartment, and roads looping the island.

The island was since purchased in 2021 by entrepreneur and motivational speaker Ed Mylett. Since purchasing, Ed has renovated an ocean front saloon, a new 10,000 sq. ft house, gym, chicken coop, horse pastures, a private golf course, greenhouses, multiple guest homes, and structure to honor his father who was the basis for Ed’s best selling book “The Power of One More.”

== See also ==
- List of islands of Maine
