= Maine Island Trail Association =

Conservation and preservation group

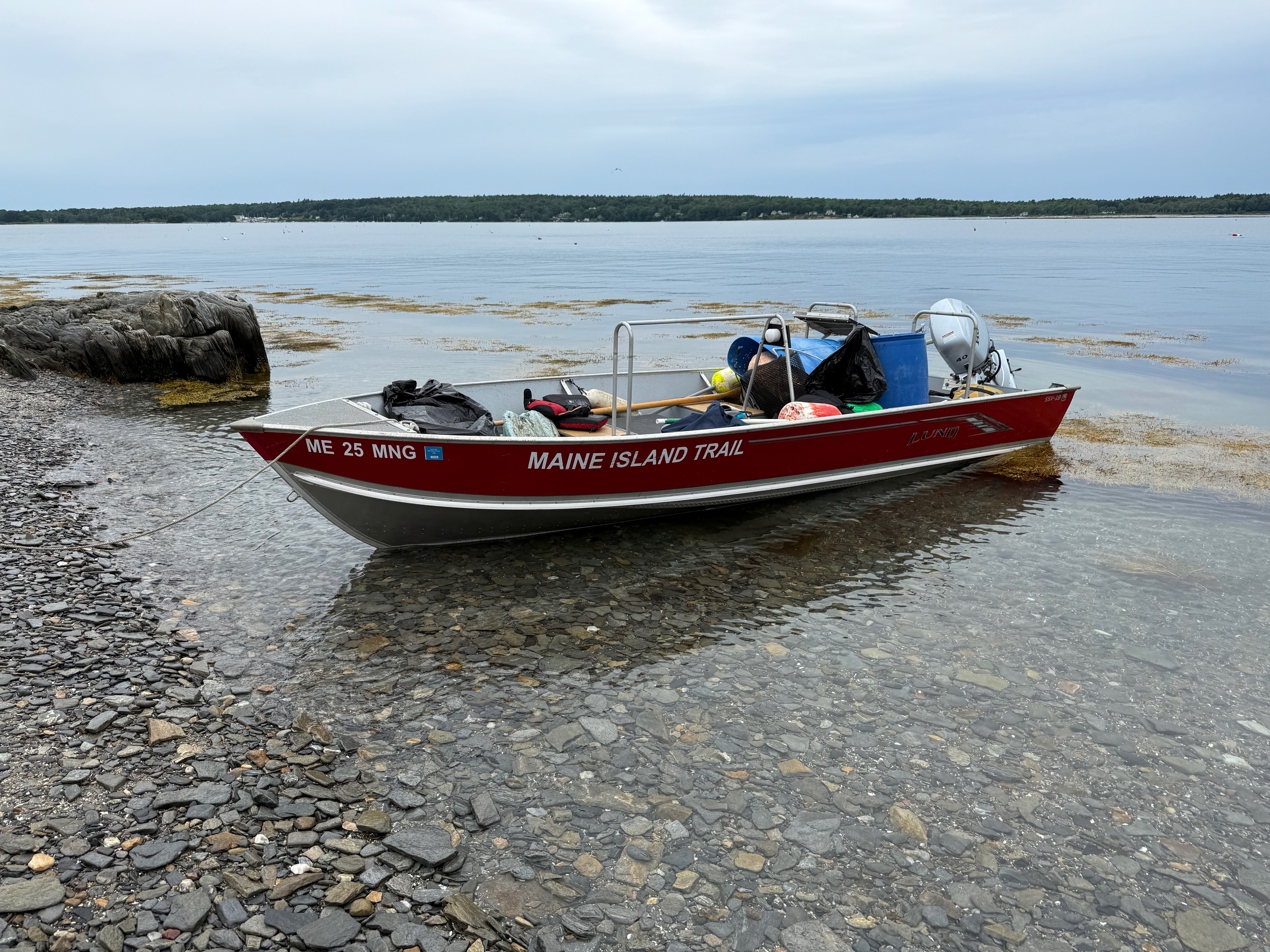
- An MITA-owned boat berthed at Stockman Island in Casco Bay
- Abbreviation: MITA
- Founded: 1988 (38 years ago)
- Founders: Dave Getchell Sr.
- Type: Nonprofit
- Headquarters: 100 Kensington Street, Portland, Maine
- Location: U.S.
- Region served: Coastal Maine
- Services: Conservation; Preservation
- Executive Director: Ben Dougherty (since 2024)
- Key people: Brian Marcaurelle (program director)
- Website: https://mita.org/

The Maine Island Trail Association (MITA) is a grassroots, volunteer-run conservation and preservation group based in Portland, Maine, United States.

== History ==
The group was co-founded by David Getchell Sr. in 1988, following a land survey, conducted by the State of Maine, of the state's uninhabited coastal islands. The survey discovered around 1,300 unclaimed geographical features, including islands and sandbars.

It also manages the Maine Island Trail, a recreational water trail which runs the entire coast of Maine, connecting (as of 2023) 182 island and 76 mainland sites available for day visits or overnight camping. MITA itself does not own any land; it supports land trusts and private landowners in the upkeep of its islands. On private and state-owned properties, public access is provided in exchange for MITA's caretaking.

As of 2023, MITA has almost 10,000 members. Its executive director between 2007 and 2024 was Doug Welch. He was succeeded by Ben Dougherty. Its program director is Brian Marcaurelle.

MITA's co-founder David R. Getchell Sr., a native of Bangor, Maine, died in 2018, aged 89.

== See also ==
- List of environmental and conservation organizations in the United States
