= Long Island, Maine =

- Town
- Seal

- Location in Cumberland County and the state of Maine.
- Coordinates: 43°39′34″N 70°07′43″W
- Country: United States
- State: Maine
- County: Cumberland
- Incorporation: July 1, 1993
- Villages: Long Island; Mariner

Area
  - Total: 33.52 sq mi (86.82 km^{2})
  - Land: 1.42 sq mi (3.68 km^{2})
  - Water: 32.10 sq mi (83.14 km^{2})
- Elevation: 0 ft (0 m)

Population (2020)
  - Total: 234
  - Density: 165/sq mi (63.6/km^{2})
- Time zone: UTC-5 (Eastern (EST))
  - Summer (DST): UTC-4 (EDT)
- ZIP Code: 04050
- Area code: 207
- FIPS code: 23-41067
- GNIS feature ID: 1729676
- Website: www.townoflongisland.us

Long Island is a Casco Bay island and town in Cumberland County, Maine, United States, which seceded from the city of Portland in 1993. The population was 234 at the 2020 census. It is part of the Portland-South Portland-Biddeford metropolitan area.

== Geography ==
According to the U.S. Census Bureau, the town has a total area of 33.52 square miles (86.82 km^{2}), of which 1.42 square miles (3.68 km^{2}) is land and 32.10 square miles (83.14 km^{2}) is water. Long Island is roughly three miles long and a mile wide.

Multiple surrounding islands lie within the Town of Long Island's municipal jurisdiction, including the privately owned College Island, Cow Island and Overset Island; Vaill Island, Outer Green Island and a portion of Little Chebeague Island, all three owned by the State of Maine; and Crow Island owned by the U.S. government.

== Demographics ==
Historical population
Census	Pop.	Note	%±
2000	202		—
2010	230		13.9%
2020	234		1.7%
U.S. Decennial Census

The official Census Bureau population count only includes year-round residents. A significant number of seasonal residents causes the population to swell to between 800 and 1,000 people during the summer, according to differing estimates. There were 225 voters registered to Long Island addresses as of March 2025.

Long Island maintains its own elementary school from grades K–5, but sends students to Portland for schooling from grades 6 through 12. The town listed 24 students during the 2024-25 academic year, with educational expenses accounting for a third of the town's net expenses in that fiscal year.

=== 2010 census ===
As of the census of 2010, there were 230 people, 99 households, and 70 families living in the town. The population density was 162.0 inhabitants per square mile (62.5/km^{2}). There were 381 housing units at an average density of 268.3 per square mile (103.6/km^{2}). The racial makeup of the town was 93.5% White, 2.2% African American, 0.4% Native American, 2.6% Asian, 0.4% from other races, and 0.9% from two or more races. Hispanic or Latino of any race were 2.2% of the population.

There were 99 households, of which 23.2% had children under the age of 18 living with them, 58.6% were married couples living together, 7.1% had a female householder with no husband present, 5.1% had a male householder with no wife present, and 29.3% were non-families. 26.3% of all households were made up of individuals, and 8.1% had someone living alone who was 65 years of age or older. The average household size was 2.32 and the average family size was 2.80.

The median age in the town was 52 years. 20.4% of residents were under the age of 18; 5.2% were between the ages of 18 and 24; 15.2% were from 25 to 44; 30.5% were from 45 to 64; and 28.7% were 65 years of age or older. The gender makeup of the town was 49.6% male and 50.4% female.

=== 2000 census ===
As of the census of 2000, there were 202 people, 93 households, and 61 families living in the town. The population density was 141.2 inhabitants per square mile (54.5/km^{2}). There were 353 housing units at an average density of 246.8 per square mile (95.3/km^{2}). The racial makeup of the town was 97.03% White, 0.99% Asian, and 1.98% from two or more races. Hispanic or Latino of any race were 0.50% of the population.

There were 93 households, out of which 31.2% had children under the age of 18 living with them, 46.2% were married couples living together, 16.1% had a female householder with no husband present, and 34.4% were non-families. 32.3% of all households were made up of individuals, and 10.8% had someone living alone who was 65 years of age or older. The average household size was 2.17 and the average family size was 2.70.

In the town, the population was spread out, with 25.2% under the age of 18, 3.5% from 18 to 24, 22.8% from 25 to 44, 30.2% from 45 to 64, and 18.3% who were 65 years of age or older. The median age was 44 years. For every 100 females, there were 100.0 males. For every 100 females age 18 and over, there were 91.1 males.

The median income for a household in the town was $35,833, and the median income for a family was $43,214. Males had a median income of $28,125 versus $28,750 for females. The per capita income for the town was $15,278. About 10.0% of families and 10.0% of the population were below the poverty line, including 8.6% of those under the age of eighteen and 11.1% of those 65 or over.

== History ==
Long Island, like other Casco Bay islands, was originally inhabited in the warm months by members of the Abenaki people until European settlers first arrived in the 17th century, including John Sears cited in a town document as the first to do so in 1640. John Smith of Boston acquired Long Island sometime between 1703 and 1706 and named it Smith Island, but is not believed to have ended up settling there.

Ezekiel Cushing purchased the island in 1732. He died in 1765, and willed the island to his nine surviving children. Soon after, other settlers arrived to make a livelihood out of farming, fishing, and catching lobsters.

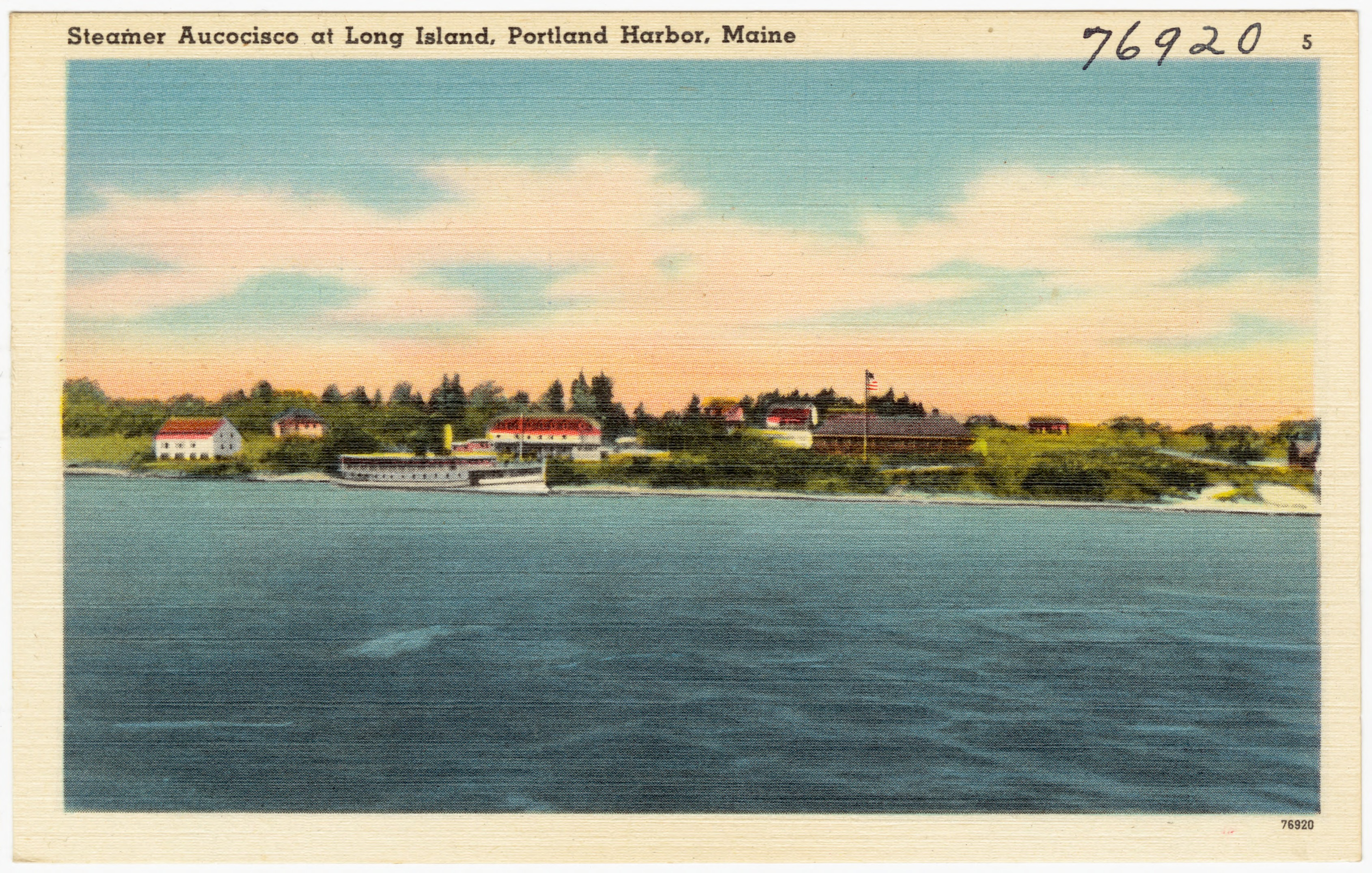
A vintage postcard depicting the steamer Aucocisco and the Long Island shore in 1930 or following years.

Long Island was among multiple Casco Bay islands where hoteliers established venues in the early 20th century, including Dirigo House on Island Avenue, the Granite Springs Hotel on Ponce Landing which was destroyed in a 1914 fire, Mountfort Inn on Garfield Street, and the Casco Bay House.

With an eye on improving defenses for Casco Bay's ship anchorages and shore infrastructure, in 1903 the U.S. Army purchased nearly 10 acres of land on Long Island that included an 80-foot hill overlooking the Hussey Sound passage into the inner bay. Sperry searchlights were installed that could illuminate ships more than five miles distant, and that could be moved on railway carts traversing narrow gauge tracks, along with protected sheds, electric generators and a small barracks to house personnel. In a military exercise in August that year testing the U.S. Navy's ability to force entry into a fortified harbor like Portland with battleships and cruisers, some 1,400 U.S. Marines and Navy sailors landed on Long Island, capturing 300 troops defending the island in the mock invasion.

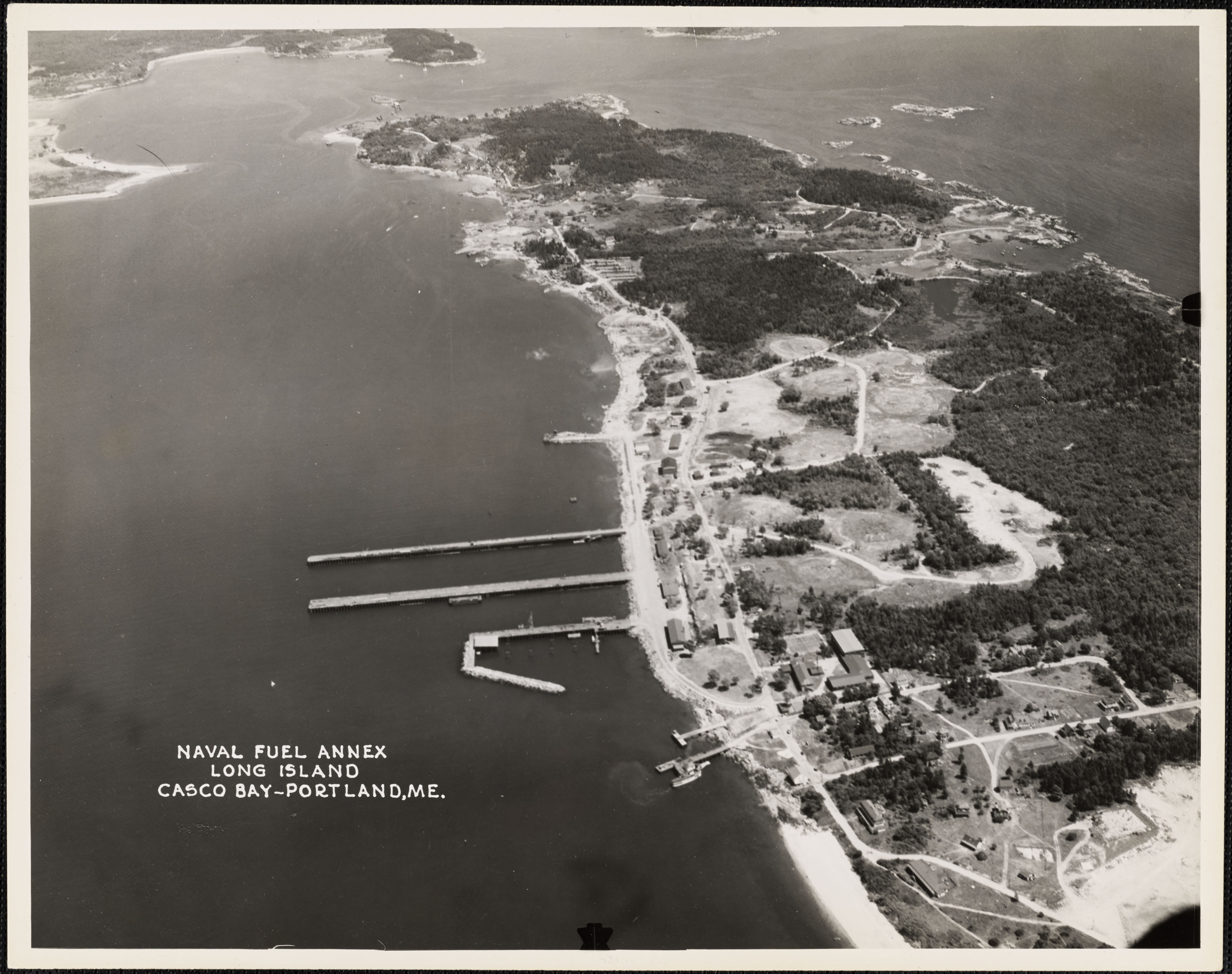
An aerial photo from July 1947 of the historic U.S. Naval Fuel Annex on Long Island in Casco Bay, Maine, in the collection of the National Archives at Boston.

During World War II, Casco Bay became U.S. Navy base Sail for destroyers escorting HX, SC, and ON convoys of the Battle of the Atlantic. Facilities constructed on the island included the Torpedo Control Officers School of the Portland Naval Training Center, a navy supply pier with a naval fuel annex often cited as a source of contamination for both the island's marsh and Casco Bay, and the Naval Auxiliary Air Facility Casco Bay seaplane base operated as part of Naval Air Station Brunswick from 14 May 1943 to 15 December 1946. The United States Army Coast Artillery Corps built two batteries of 90 mm dual-purpose guns on the island as the Long Island Military Reservation, part of the Harbor Defenses of Portland. On one of the island's highest hills, a 65-foot concrete tower was constructed with a 25-foot wooden superstructure on top, as a radar observation station.

After the war, tourism became the most popular industry, and several small stores, a fire station, and a K–5 school (1953) were built.

In 1969, the U.S. government sold the historic naval fuel annex to King Resources, which envisioned a supertanker port on Long Island that, combined with the existing Portland–Montreal pipeline to Canada, would make Casco Bay the largest crude oil export destination in the world by volume at the time. The initial King Resources purchase included 181 acres of land, a 600-foot pier and 15 underground fuel storage tanks with a capacity in excess of 623,000 barrels. King Resources bought an additional 175 acres on Long Island for its plant, along with the historic Fort McKinley property on nearby Great Diamond Island, but eventually abandoned the project as delays and costs grew as a result of opposition by environmental and community groups.

In 1972, oil leaking from the Wilh. Wilhelmsen tanker Tamano washed ashore on Long Island, after the tanker proceeded to an anchorage between Long Island and Clapboard Island with the crew unaware that the ship had struck Soldier Ledge while passing through Hussey Sound. Remediation included the removal of six inches of sand from Long Island's West Beach for disposal at a landfill at Naval Air Station Brunswick.

The island was originally part of the City of Portland, which re-evaluated property taxes in 1990. Due in part to high real estate prices paid by out-of-state residents and property aesthetic values, property taxes increased substantially. Many residents felt this move created an unfair discrepancy between the money paid to Portland and the services they received in return. The island voted to secede from Portland, and on July 1, 1993, the island was declared the Town of Long Island. The Long Island Historical Society now houses every news article that was printed about the secession movement as well as video and film footage of the secession ceremonies. These archives also include copies of the local and national news coverage given to the community during its "rebellion".

In 2006, Northland Residential deeded to the town 116 acres of former naval fuel annex land a predecessor company had acquired from King Resources, after redeveloping other parcels of the former government property for residential and commercial use. The town set up the Long Island Community Land Operating Co. to maintain the property as a nature conservation preserve, known as "The Area" to island residents.

== Community life ==
The Town of Long Island has a board of selectmen with three elected members who serve staggered terms, one of them holding the role of chair; and a town administrator.

Long Island is part of District 25 in the Maine Senate, and District 110 in the Maine House of Representatives.

In 2004, Long Island became a founding member of the Maine Islands Coalition, along with other year-round island communities that do not have bridge access to the mainland.

The town's revenue and expenses totaled nearly $2 million for the fiscal year ending in June 2024.

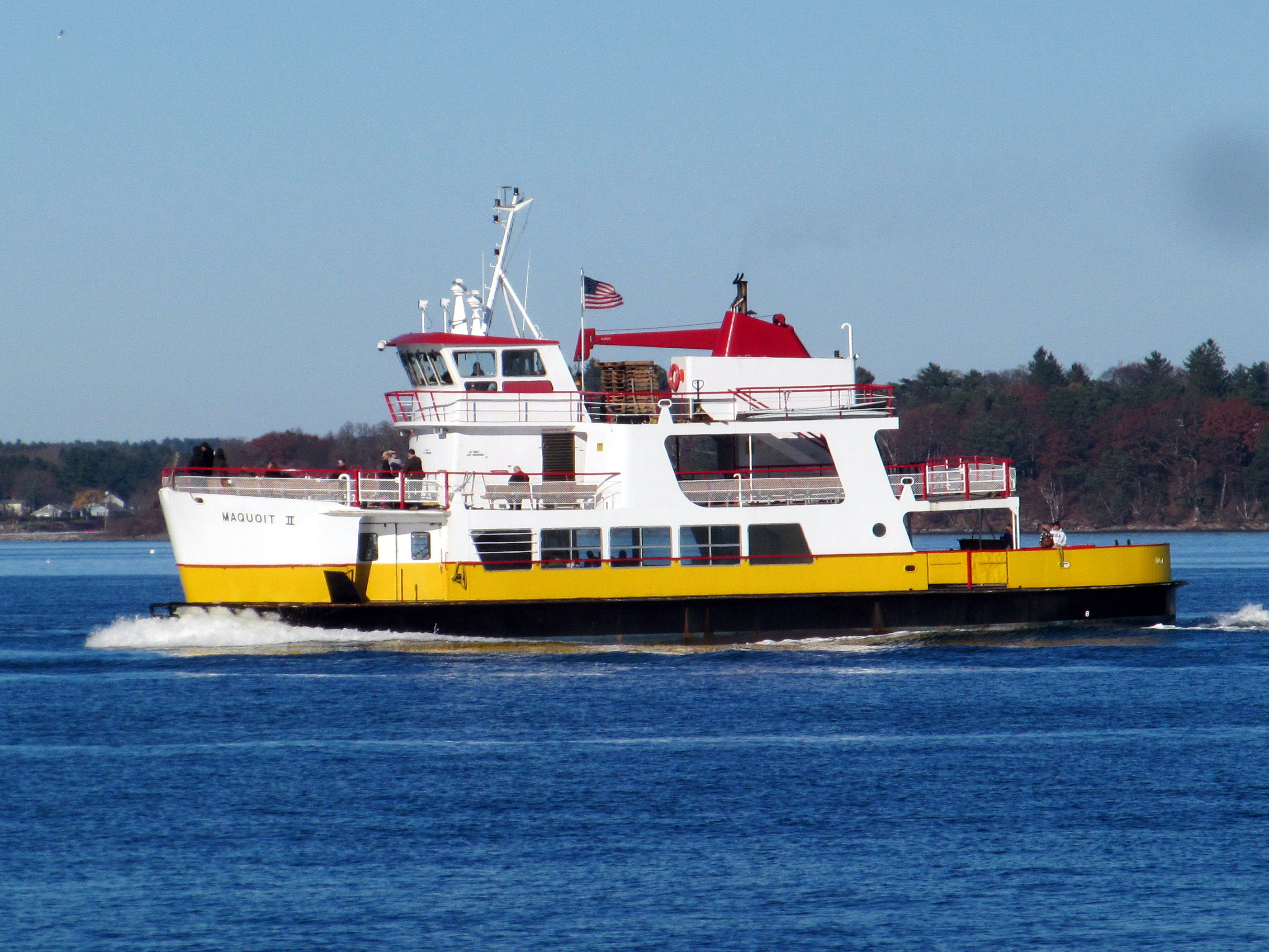
A 2016 photo of Maquoit II operated by Casco Bay Lines, with the ferry providing passenger, freight and vehicle service to Long Island.

Casco Bay Lines provides passenger and freight ferry service between Portland and Long Island, with seasonal adjustments of departure times and frequencies. Trip times typically last between 30 minutes and an hour. The company also operates a vehicle ferry to Long Island, with reservations required and no set schedule for service.

Long Island emergency resources include Long Island Fire & Rescue which has trained emergency medical technician capabilities; a wellness center with limited hours for nursing care and visiting physicians and veterinarians; policing by the Cumberland County Sheriff's Department and island constables for ordinance enforcement; a harbormaster for water assistance and enforcement; a speedboat for emergency transport to shore; and a designated emergency shelter equipped with a power generator.

In addition to the Long Island School, island facilities and properties include the Mariner's Wharf ferry landing; a Long Island Community Center that hosts workshops and other events; the Long Island Community Library; a VFW hall; a U.S. Postal Service office; a community garden; nature tracts; beaches; and athletic fields and courts. A portion of Andrews Beach, known alternatively as South Beach, is part of Maine's State Park system.

Long Island's older Ponce's Landing once used for ferry service is now a public landing and commercial dock for lobster boats and other working boats.

Long Island has been a host site for the Maine Lobster Boat Races, which are staged each summer at several sites along the Maine coast.
