= Diamond Island (Tennessee) =

Island in Tennessee, United States

Coordinates: 35.176471°N 88.313651°W

Diamond Island is a river island on the Tennessee River in Hardin County, Tennessee.

Diamond Island was so named on account of its diamond shape.

Diamond Island was purchased jointly by William Albert Warren and his brother Joshua Warren in 1851

Hardin County historian, David Cagle reports: "Sarah Thomas called me with information re Diamond Island. When TVA was surveying this property in 1938, a local resident, Will Hinton informed TVA that Warren Cemetery was located on the Island. The only grave mentioned was that of Mrs. (William) Al Warren. I guess that could be either of his wives?"

Mr. Cagle also surmises that William Albert Warren, who died ~1865, is also buried on the Island as well. As recent as 1940, the TVA maps indicated a barn on the island. Probably not an original structure, but it was probably built in the general area of the original residence.
