= Chebeague Island Inn =

Historic inn in Maine, United States

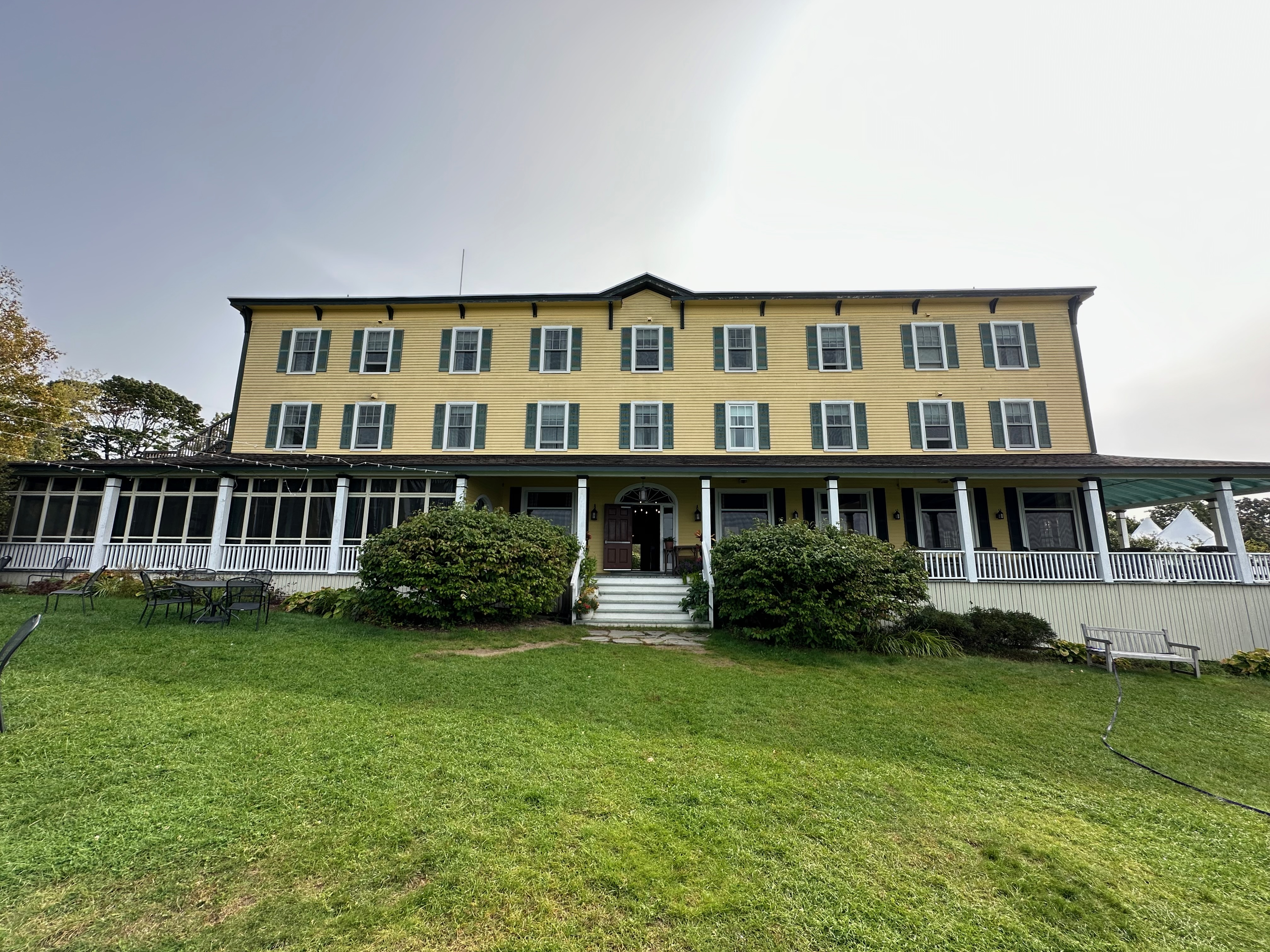
- The inn in 2023
- Interactive map of the Chebeague Island Inn area
- Former names: Hillcrest Hotel

General information
- Location: Chebeague Island, Maine, 61 South Road
- Coordinates: 43.7524340°N 70.103294°W
- Opening: 1880s

Technical details
- Floor count: 3

Other information
- Number of rooms: 26
- Number of restaurants: 1
- Number of bars: 1

Website
- www.chebeagueislandinn.com

The Chebeague Island Inn is located on Chebeague Island, Maine, United States. Situated in 2.5 acres (0.0039 sq mi), on South Road, near the northern tip of the island, the inn overlooks part of Casco Bay. Just beyond the western edge of the inn's property, Stone Wharf Landing is where the Chebeague Island Ferry, which runs to and from Cousins Island, berths on the island. The inn also overlooks a few holes of the island's nine-hole golf course.

The inn, which has twenty-six rooms, was built in the 1880s, and was originally known as the Hillcrest Hotel. The inn burned down in the early 20th century and was rebuilt in 1925. It was given its current name in 2000, and was fully renovated in 2004.

It is open between May and October.
