= Chebeague Island =

- Town
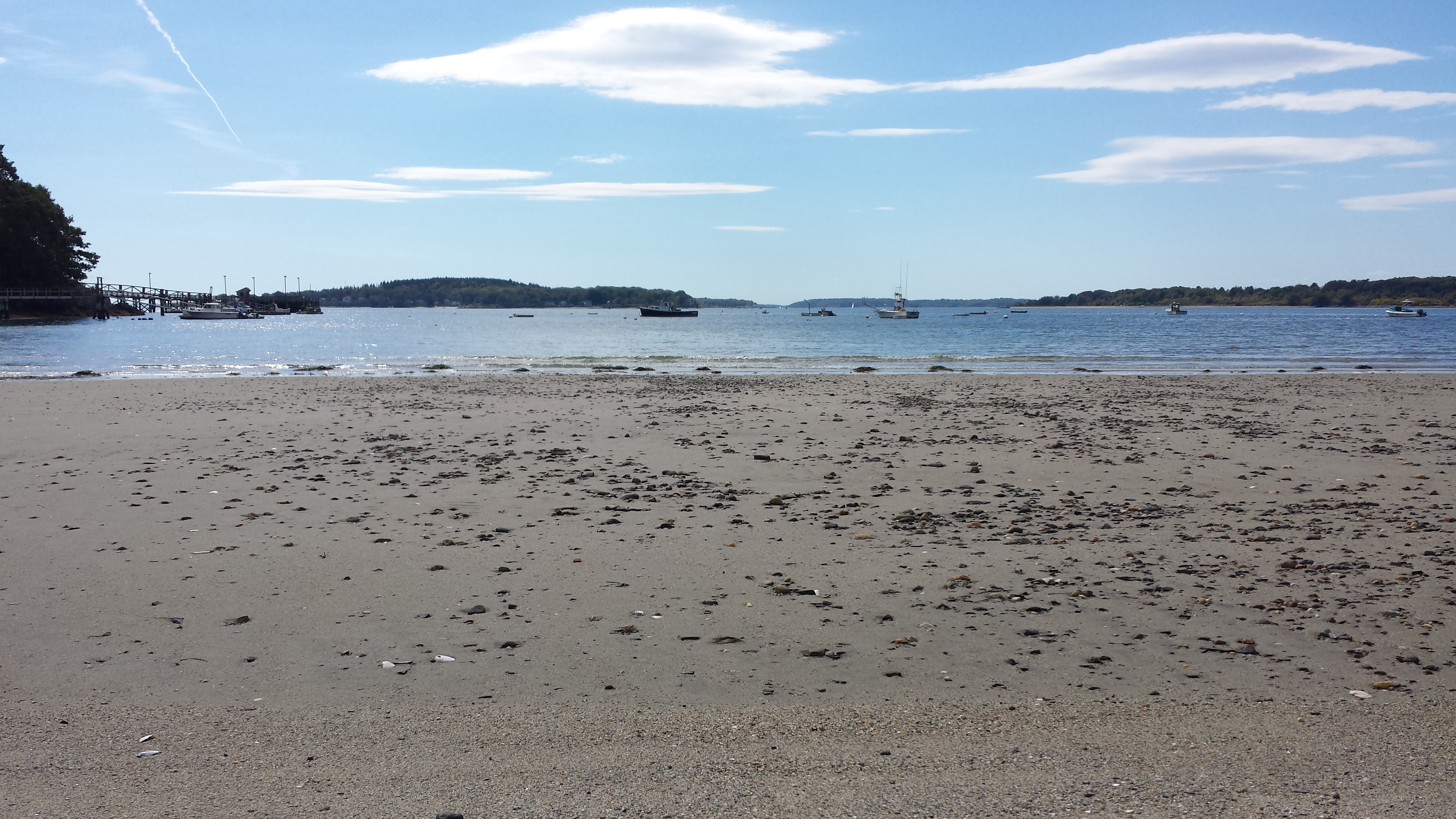
- Chandler's Cove beach, looking southwest

- Seal

- Location in Cumberland County and the state of Maine.
- Coordinates: 43°42′35″N 70°06′26″W
- Country: United States
- State: Maine
- County: Cumberland
- Incorporated: July 1, 2007

Area
  - Total: 24.56 sq mi (63.61 km^{2})
  - Land: 3.56 sq mi (9.22 km^{2})
  - Water: 21.00 sq mi (54.39 km^{2})
- Elevation: 0 ft (0 m)

Population (2020)
  - Total: 396
  - Density: 110/sq mi (43/km^{2})
- Time zone: UTC-5 (Eastern (EST))
  - Summer (DST): UTC-4 (EDT)
- ZIP code: 04017
- Area code: 207
- GNIS feature ID: 2364069
- Website: www.townofchebeagueisland.org

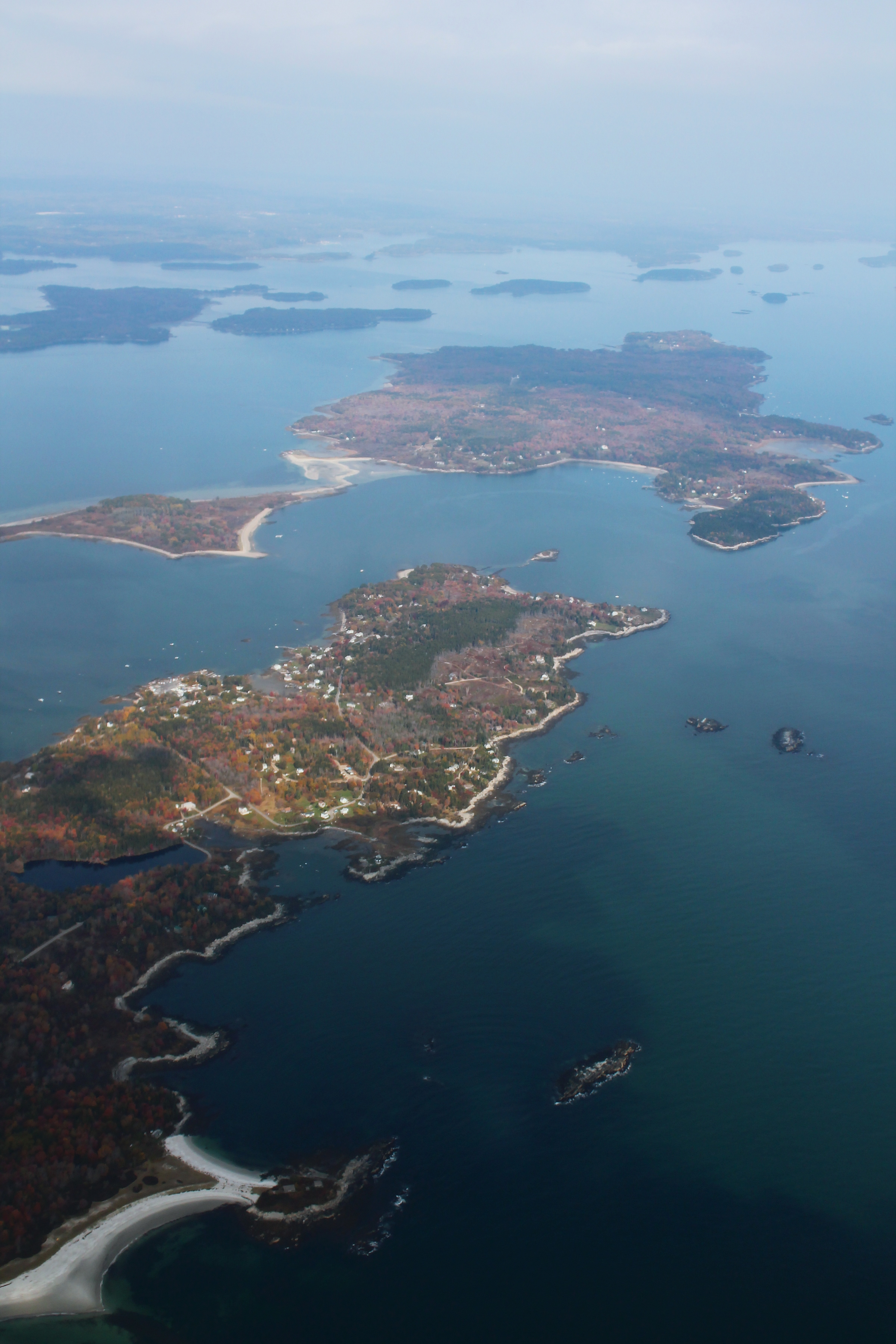
An aerial view showing Chebeague Island in the distance.

Chebeague Island (/ʃəˈbiːɡ/, shə-BEEG or /ʃəˈbɪɡ/, shə-BIG) is a town in Cumberland County, Maine, United States, with Great Chebeague Island located in Casco Bay as the town's dominant landform.

Chebeague Island was a part of the Town of Cumberland until July 1, 2007, when it seceded and became the Town of Chebeague Island. Fifteen islands and portions of two more are part of the Town of Chebeague Island.

At the 2020 census, the town's year-round population was 396. The population is said to more than triple in the summer months.

== Geography ==
According to the United States Census Bureau, the town has a total area of 24.56 square miles (63.61 km^{2}), of which 3.56 square miles (9.22 km^{2}) is land and 21.00 square miles (54.39 km^{2}) is water. The town estimates the size of Great Chebeague Island at 1,930 acres.

At approximately 3 miles (5 km) long and 1 mile (2 km) wide, Great Chebeague is the largest island in Casco Bay with no bridge access to the mainland. The northern tip of the island is called Chebeague Point and the southern tip is called Deer Point.

The Town of Chebeague Island includes fifteen islands in their entirety and adjacent waters. These include Great Chebeague, Bangs, Bates, Broken Cove, Goose Nest, Hope, Little Jewell, Ministerial, Rogues, Sand, Stave, Stockman, West Brown Cow and Upper Green islands; and Crow Island, just off Great Chebeague's eastern shore (another Crow Island in Chandler Cove is part of the Town of Long Island). Portions of Jewell and Little Chebeague islands are also part of the Town of Chebeague Island.

Great Chebeague Island is not always a single landmass, with adjacent Little Chebeague accessible on foot at low tide via a sandbar.

In 2014, Great Chebeague Island's mean tide was reported at 9.1 feet (2.8 m) with ranges of 3.5 feet (1.1 m) at high and low tides. The underwater topography and resulting depths of surrounding waters can vary drastically, with ledges and shallows creating hazards for vessels. A channel has been dredged in the past to the island's wharf for ferry service.

Chebeague Island is located 10 miles (16 km) northeast of Portland, Maine's largest city. Chebeague Island is part of the Portland–South Portland–Biddeford, Maine Metropolitan Statistical Area.

== Ecology ==
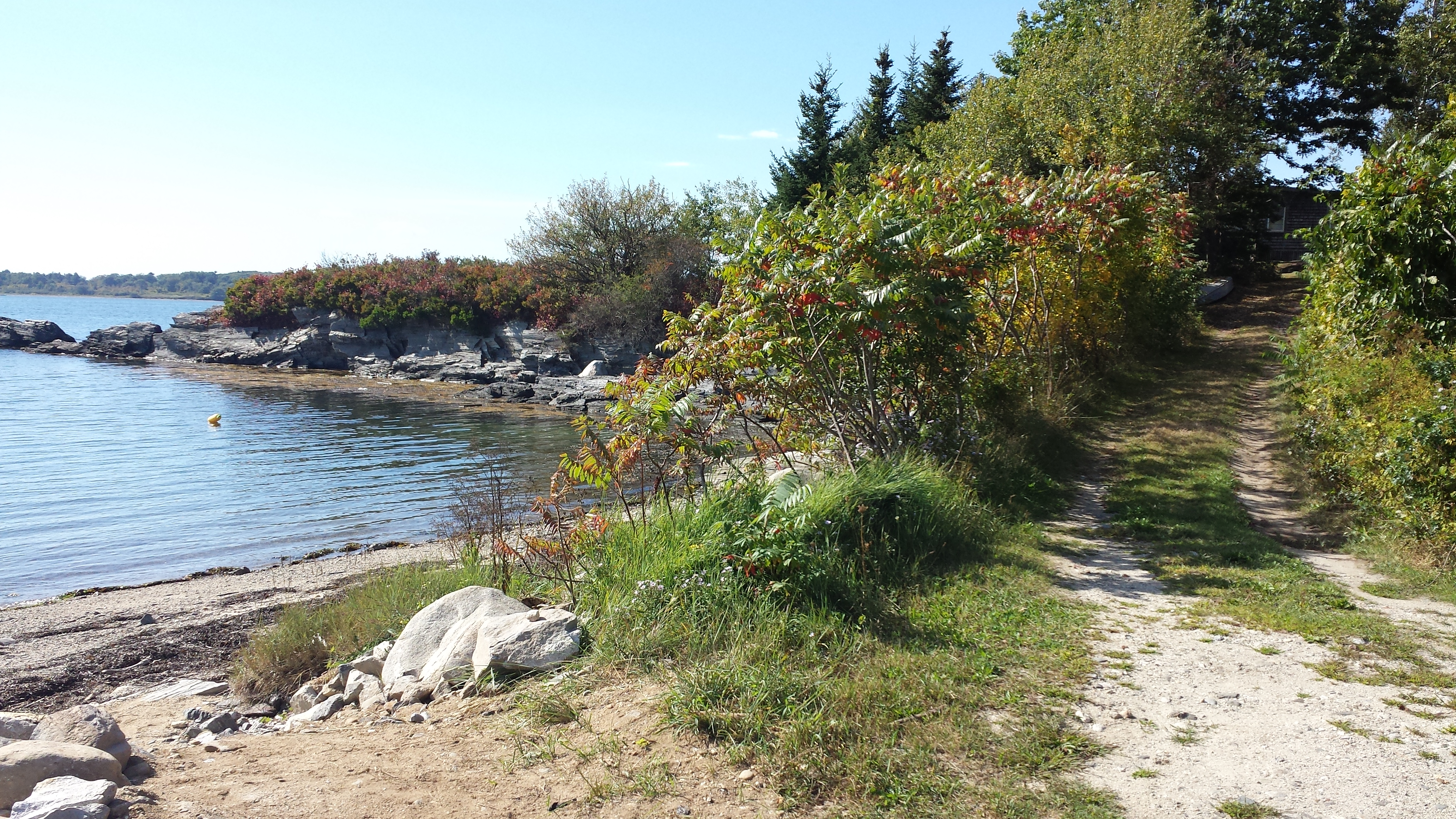
Chebeague Island end of Bennetts Cove Rd.

In 2024 and 2025, birds observed on Chebeague Island include the chickadee, common goldeneye, common loon, European starling, herring gull, great black-backed gull, eastern bluebird, mallard and white-winged scoter and wild turkey, among numerous species.

Other animal species on Chebeague include White-tailed deer, squirrel, beaver, frogs, hares, muskrat, raccoon, salamanders, snakes and American red fox.

Harbor seals are active in the waters around Chebeague Island, with seal pups on occasion having gotten stranded on island beaches. Harbor porpoises have been spotted in the waters near Chebeague.

Chebeague Island is one of four municipalities on Casco Bay that rank in the top quartile statewide for numbers of active lobstering licenses, along with neighboring Long Island, Harpswell and Phippsburg.

Chebeague Island employs a shellfish warden to oversee clam licensing and harvesting on the shore. Like other communities in Casco Bay and Maine, clam beds have been closed periodically during periods of red tide.

== History ==
The name "Chebeague" evolved from Chebiscodego, the name used by members of the Wabanaki Confederacy, a First Nations and Native American confederation of five principal nations: the Mi'kmaq, Maliseet, Passamaquoddy, Abenaki, and Penobscot. Historians have cited one possible definition of the word Chebeague as "island of many springs." Other sources state that Chebeague comes from the Abenaki words T’Cabie or Chebidisco, meaning cold spring, or Jabeque or Gaboag, meaning separated, which recognizes the connectedness of Great Chebeague and Little Chebeague islands. Great Chebeague Island was also known for stretches as Indian Isle, Merry's Island and Recompense Island.

The early Native American presence on Great Chebeague was not year-round. During the summer months, Native Americans arrived by canoe to fish and gather shellfish for the winter months.

Walter Merry of Boston bought Great Chebeague by 1650, from Portland settler George Cleeve or from Alexander Rigby according to differing accounts.

Falmouth merchant Thomas Westbrook became a subsequent landholder of most of Great Chebeague at some point during the first half of the 18th century. By 1743, Samuel Waldo executed a legal seizure of Great Chebeague, and partnered with Falmouth resident John Waite to establish a livestock farm on 1,400 acres in the island's northern section.

Zachariah Chandler acquired 650 acres on the island's southern side in 1746, and in 1756 sold Ambrose Hamilton 50 acres of land, who would double his acreage within a few years.

Waite died in 1769, and during the American Revolution his son Col. John Waite relocated the farm to the mainland given exposure on Great Chebeague to British raiding parties.

Early commerce on the island developed around fishing, farming, and the construction of "stone sloops," ships that carried quarried granite down the eastern seaboard for the building of breakwaters, lighthouses, and set navigational markers.

The U.S. Postal Service appointed a postmaster for Great Chebeague Island on May 11, 1868. Little Chebeague Island had a post office for several months in 1889 servicing a resort there.

By the late 19th century and throughout the early 20th century, tourists from Canada, Boston, and points south began to visit Maine in a phenomenon sometimes known as the "rusticators" movement, where residents of New England's industrial cities sought to get back to nature for a few days or weeks. The tourists filled the cottages, rooming houses, and inns, such as the Chebeague Island Inn, that dotted the islands of Casco Bay. In 1900, Great Chebeague Island had five hotels. Tourists arrived on steamboats from Portland.

Maritime occupations also continued to contribute to Great Chebeague's island economy in the 19th and 20th centuries, including the Fenderson Clam Factory which purchased soft-shell and quahog clams from local diggers for canning and wholesale distribution. Clams were sufficiently a commodity that they could be exchanged for purchases at an island store.

In 1956, construction was completed on a bridge connecting nearby Cousins Island to Yarmouth, and over subsequent years Great Chebeague Island residents considered a bridge to Cousins Island or adjacent Littlejohn Island for direct vehicular access to the mainland. A statewide referendum proposing a $3 million bridge to Great Chebeague was rejected in 1963 by a 70% to 30% margin.

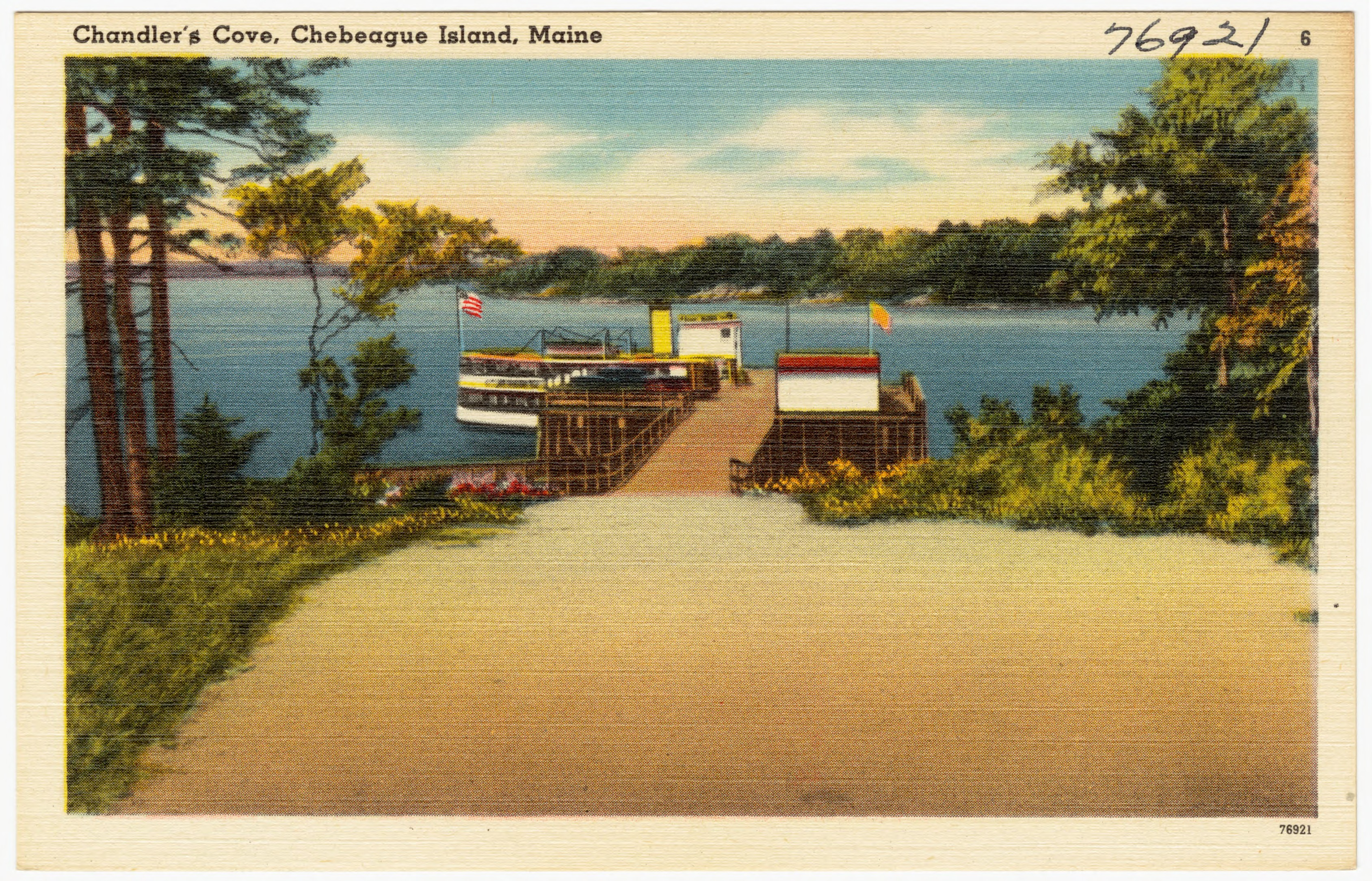
Chandler's Cove, Chebeague Island, Maine

The Chebeague High School closed in 1956. The schoolhouse, built in 1871, still stands and serves as a museum of Chebeague Island history.

In 1971, the Chebeague Transportation Co. was formed to provide ferry service to Cousins Island and by extension the mainland, initially using a converted fishing boat. In the early 1980s, the CTC board authorized construction of Islander, a 52-foot steel ferry with capacity for nearly 120 passengers and freight. In 2019, CTC added the slightly longer Independence as its primary ferry.

In 1997, Great Chebeague Island residents played a significant role in convincing Nabisco to reverse a decision to end production of its Crown Pilot Crackers brand of chowder crackers. The initial campaign was successful and Nabisco donated $1,000 to the Chebeague Historical Society. In 2000, Kraft Foods acquired Nabisco and in 2008 discontinued production of Crown Pilot Crackers.

In 2002 Chebeague Island explored secession from Cumberland, with whom they had been tied for 184 years. The initiative gained traction after school district 51 considered downsizing the island elementary school. The island won independence from Cumberland after votes in the Maine Senate (31–3) and House of Representatives (131–1) on April 5, 2006. The separation took effect on July 1, 2007.

== Demographics ==
Historical population
Census	Pop.	Note	%±
2010	341		—
2020	396		16.1%
U.S. Decennial Census

As of the 2020 United States census, Chebeague Island had a population of 396 people, a 16% increase from 2010.

There were 300 households in the Town of Chebeague Island as of 2020, and 614 units of housing including those used seasonally by people with primary residences elsewhere.

Among Chebeague Island residents, median annual income was $63,750 in 2020 with 49.5% of Chebeague Island residents employed.

== Community life ==
The Town of Chebeague Island has used the town meeting form of government since its 2007 inception as a municipality, with registered voters casting ballots on budgets, changes in municipal ordinances and other major actions by the town subject to referendum.

Selectboard members are elected to three-year terms, as the case for school board members.

Chebeague Island is part of Maine's 1st congressional district; Maine's 23rd State Senate district; and the 110th district in the Maine House of Representatives.

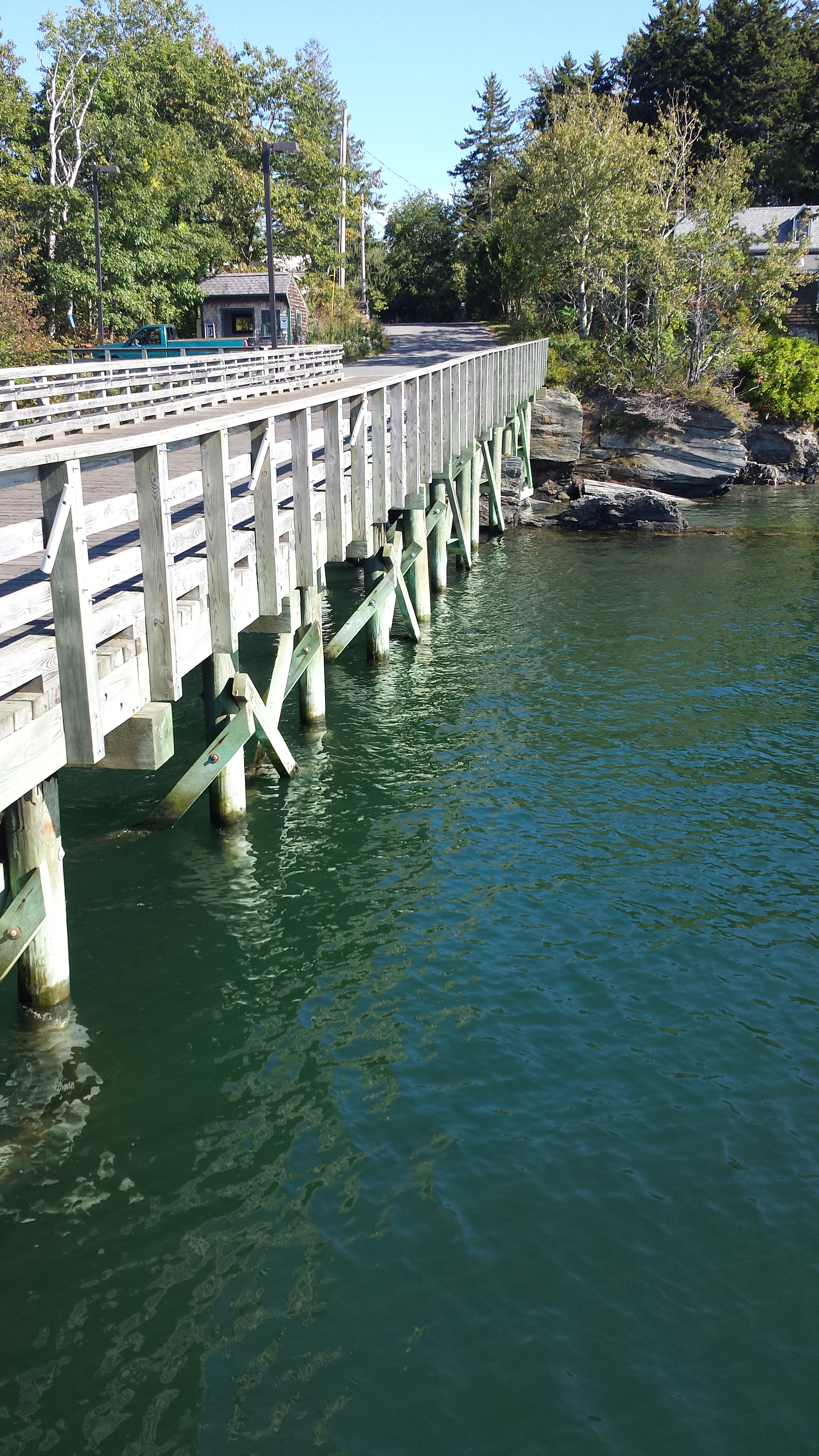
Chebeague Island Casco Bay landing

=== Transportation ===
Two ferry services provide passenger, cargo and vehicle transportation to and from Great Chebeague Island. Chebeague Transportation Company's (CTC) ferry, the Independence, makes the 15-minute run from Wharf Road on Cousins Island to the Stone Wharf on the northwest side of Great Chebeague. CTC provides bus transport to a Cumberland parking lot reserved for Chebeague Island visitors and seasonal residents, with year-round residents having access to a parking lot on Cousins Island.

Casco Bay Lines provides service from Portland on all mail boat and other "down-bay" trips that travel beyond Long Island, including at Chebeague Island Wharf on Chandler Cove.

As of 2010, Great Chebeague Island had about nine miles of paved roads and three miles of gravel roadways, some wide enough for only a single vehicle, with North and South roads linking roads across the island.

Most year-round Chebeague Island residents have "island cars" that are not required to have license plates, although they must be registered.

The Town of Chebeague Island allows the use of registered golf carts and offroad vehicles on public roads, with both forms of transport subject to additional regulations.

=== Education ===
The public Chebeague Island School offers pre-kindergarten through fifth grade, with ten students enrolled in the 2020-2021 school year with two teachers on staff.

Students in sixth through eighth grades can attend the public Frank H. Harrison Middle School in Yarmouth, with Yarmouth High School the public option for students in grades nine through twelve.

=== Municipal services ===
The Town of Chebeague Island has a webpage that provides access to town documents, a town calendar, and other information.

Chebeague Island has a U.S Postal Service office post under the 04017-9998 ZIP Code. There is cell phone service on the island.

The Chebeague Island Library is open year-round.

The Town of Chebeague Island supports Chebeague Island Fire & Rescue which with volunteers staffs three engine companies, a water tanker and an ambulance. Around-the-clock transport to mainland medical facilities is available.

The Town of Chebeague Island has contracts with the Cumberland County Sheriff's Office for law enforcement. During the summer months, the town provides quarters for an officer and family members on Great Chebeague.

An assisted living community called Island Commons has capacity for seven residents, also offering adult day care services and in-home health and supportive services to Chebeague Island residents.

The Chebeague Community Church is the island's only house of worship, having disaffiliated from the United Methodist Church in 2021. The church's roots extend to 1802 when the first Methodist congregation was formed, with the church edifice dating to 1855.

The Chebeague Island Boat Yard provides a variety of services ranging from indoor heated storage and nightly mooring rentals to portable marine engine diagnostics and fabricating or refinishing woodwork. A gift shop and eatery operates at the Boat Yard during the summer.

=== Recreation ===
The Chebeague Recreation Center offers summer day camps for children, and the Chebeague Island Yacht Club offers a boating and sailing camp during the summer.

The Maine Coastal Public Access Guide lists 18 shoreline properties on Great Chebeague Island that allow public access. The entirety of uninhabited Little Chebeague Island is open to the public under management by the Maine Bureau of Parks and Lands and the Maine Island Trail Association.

A local historical museum run by the Chebeague Island Historical Society is open during the summer months.

Chebeague Island Living History Farm at Second Wind Farm grows produce and offers tours and other activities.

The Chebeague Island Inn and restaurant is open in the summer, as is a nine-hole golf course, and a tennis club.

== Notable person ==
- David Dodd: educator, financial analyst, author and economist

== See also ==
- List of islands of Maine
