= Cliff Island =

Island in Casco Bay, in Portland, Maine, US

Coordinates: 43°41′46″N 70°06′28″W

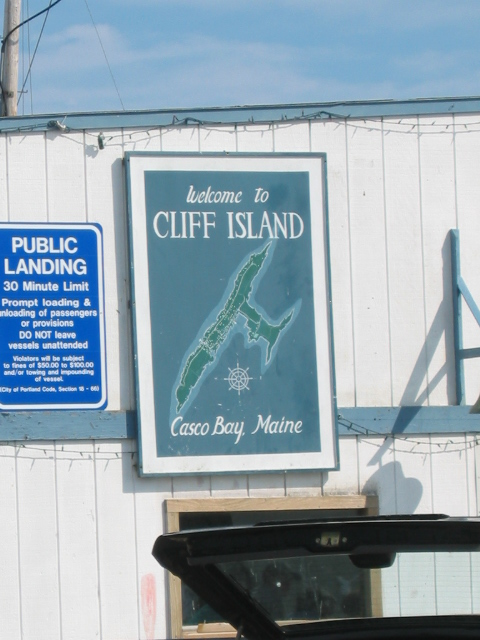
A welcoming sign to visitors

Looking back from Cliff Island ferry landing to channel between Hope Island and Long Island

Cliff Island is an island in Casco Bay, Maine, United States. It is part of the city of Portland. As of the 2000 census, the island had a year-round population of approximately 60 people. In the summer, the island's population grows to about 200, despite the fact that it is the only year-round inhabited island in Casco Bay with no paved roads. The ZIP Code for Cliff Island is 04019.

In the early 20th century, the island's inns were a draw for summer tourists. There are no longer any hotels, but many homes are available for weekly rentals or longer. While there are no public services, residents enjoy a community hall, a tennis court, baseball field, and playground. The residents are served by a USPS Post Office, fire department, and one-room school for elementary grades. While the postal service has considered closing the office in the past, the islanders have managed to keep it in operation for six hours a day.

== Transportation ==
Cliff Island residents (also known as Cliff Islanders) travel back and forth to the mainland via the Casco Bay Lines ferry service. The ride takes about one hour. Residents mostly buy groceries in Portland, but there is a small store on the island.

Bicycles, golf carts and electric carts are most often used for transportation. A barge ramp was added in 2008 to ease delivery of trucks and heavy items.

== See also ==
- List of islands of Maine
- Education in Maine
- Edward S. Ellis
