= Maine Island Trail =

Recreational water trail in Maine

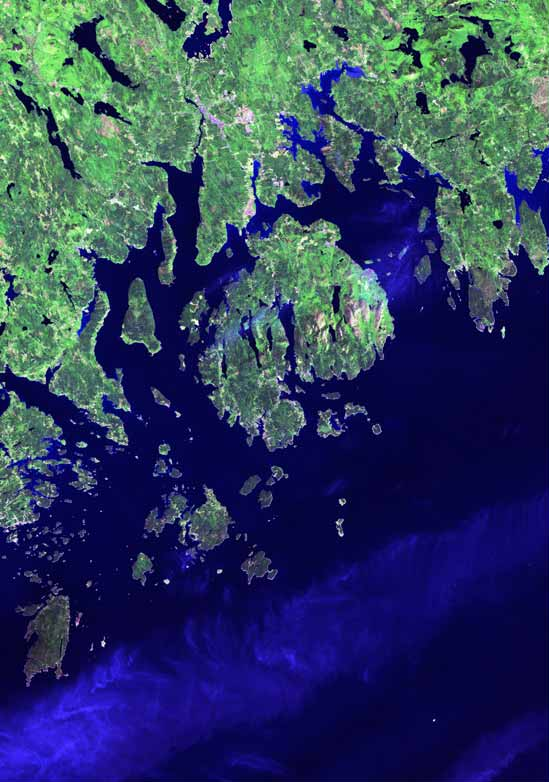
There are 3,200 islands off the coast of Maine, the largest being Mount Desert Island

The Maine Island Trail is a recreational water trail that spans the entire coast of Maine, connecting over 200 islands (having originally been thirty) and mainland sites available for day visits or overnight camping. The 375-mile (604 km) trail is operated by the Maine Island Trail Association (MITA), a non-profit membership organization based in Portland, Maine, with over 6,000 members. Trail properties are owned by private landowners, conservation organizations, and federal, state and municipal agencies, all of whom make their land available to MITA members in exchange for Leave No Trace use and careful stewardship. All sites—many of which are concentrated between Casco Bay and Mount Desert Island—are accessible by personal watercraft, such as sea kayaks, sailboats or powerboats.

Stewardship services include island cleanups, work projects, monitoring, and the removal of invasive species such as Japanese Knotweed, Black Swallowwort, Asiatic Bittersweet, Japanese Barberry, and Bush Honeysuckles.

The annual MITA Guidebook, distributed in the spring to MITA members, offers details on accessing all MITA sites. Most sites require no additional fees or reservations beyond initial membership dues. The Guidebook outlines basic paddling and boating safety guidelines, Leave No Trace principles, and comprehensive site descriptions. The Guide can also be downloaded as a mobile app. The app includes photos, anchorage locations, an interactive National Oceanic and Atmospheric Administration (NOAA) chart, launches and pumpouts. Anyone can download the app and access content, but only current MITA members have full access to all app features.

Rising Tide Brewing brews Maine Island Trail Ale, a session IPA.
