= Little Diamond Island =

Island in Casco Bay, Maine

Coordinates: 43.667189°N 70.208076°W

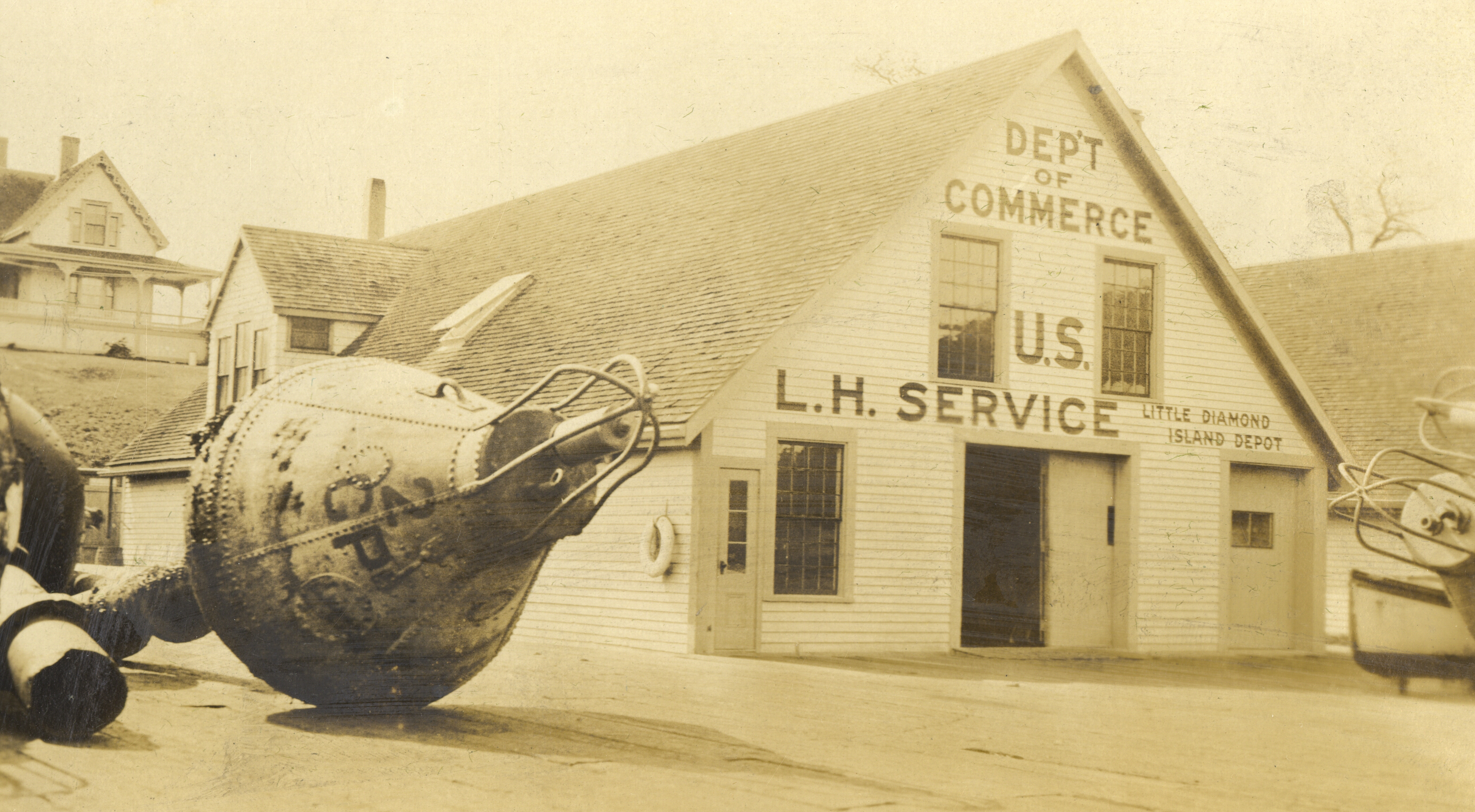
Little Diamond Island Depot in 1925

Little Diamond Island is an island in Casco Bay, Maine, United States. It is part of the city of Portland.

The island was formerly known as Little Hog Island. It is mostly made up of private property, and it is a vacation destination. It can be accessed by ferry from the mainland.

As of the 2000 census, the island had a year-round population of five. There are few permanent residents because the water supply is turned off during the winter.

== See also ==
- List of islands of Maine
