= Great Diamond Island =

Island in Casco Bay, Maine

Coordinates: 43°40′45″N 70°11′50″W

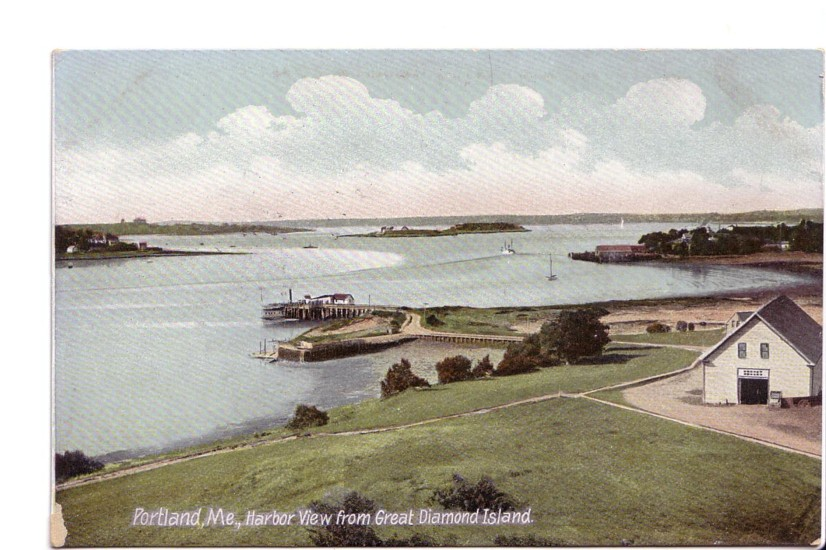
Vintage postcard depicting Great Diamond Island, Casco Bay, and Portland Maine

Great Diamond Island is an island in Casco Bay, Maine, United States. It is part of the city of Portland. At the 2000 census, the island had a year-round population of 77. The island is not accessible from the mainland by motor vehicle and has a limited network of roads. The primary modes of transportation are golf carts and bicycles. This fact has become a selling point for the island, marketing the area as "car free" and "kid friendly". The island was used as a military base starting in the late 19th century and continuing through World War II. After the base was decommissioned, the bunkers and residences were left idle for over 30 years before being developed and sold to private citizens.

== Diamond Cove ==
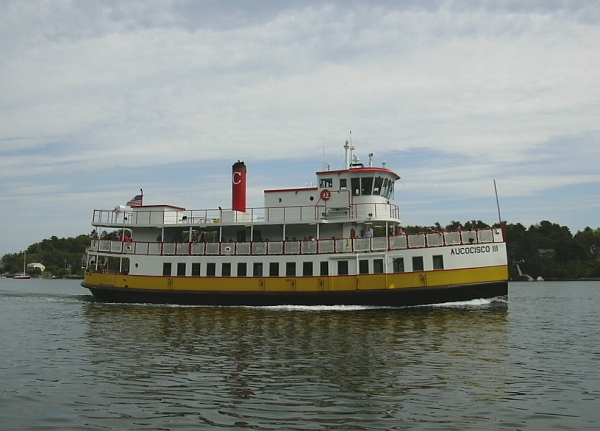
A Casco Bay Lines ferry sailing "down the bay" after stopping at Diamond Cove.

Diamond Cove is a ferry stop at the northeastern side of the island. The Diamond Cove properties are on the grounds of the former Fort McKinley, making use of the army barracks and officer's quarters as renovated homes. The abandoned concrete coastal artillery batteries exist in the woods at the east of the island, although they are technically private property and off-limits due to safety concerns. The community is gated and, for the most part, not open to the general public, although the Diamond's Edge restaurant is open and located just off the Casco Bay ferry dock. Tours of the grounds, by reservation, are available. A limited number of homes have been built on the waterfront areas of the island; many have been featured in local magazines and newspapers. The Fort McKinley Historic District was listed on the National Register of Historic Places in 1985.

Crown Jewel, another seasonal restaurant near the former Quartermasters Quarters, offers surprising new twists to a seafood menu. Billed as one of Portland’s best eateries. In a 2010 GQ magazine article about the coolest small cities in America, visiting the Diamond Cove General Store to get a lobster roll made their list of four must-see places in Portland.

=== History ===
Great Diamond Island used to be named Great Hog Island. Diamond Cove was initially an artistic retreat community, hosting visitors such as Henry Wadsworth Longfellow and Harriet Beecher Stowe, and it included amenities including a nine-hole golf course. At the time of the Spanish–American War, the island was converted almost entirely to a military base to defend Casco Bay. Fort McKinley was constructed between 1891 and 1907 and remained in service until the end of World War II in 1945. The property at Diamond Cove remained abandoned for decades, until its renovation to the community it is today.

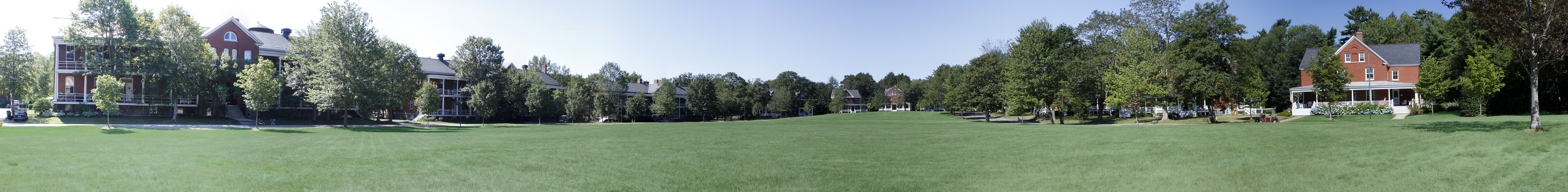
A panoramic view of the Parade Ground at Diamond Cove. Barracks buildings (currently town homes) to the left and officer's row at center and right.

== See also ==
- List of islands of Maine
- 8th Coast Artillery (United States)
- Great Diamond Island Site, a prehistoric shell midden site on the island
