= Bailey Island Library Hall =

Historic place in Maine, United States

- U.S. National Register of Historic Places
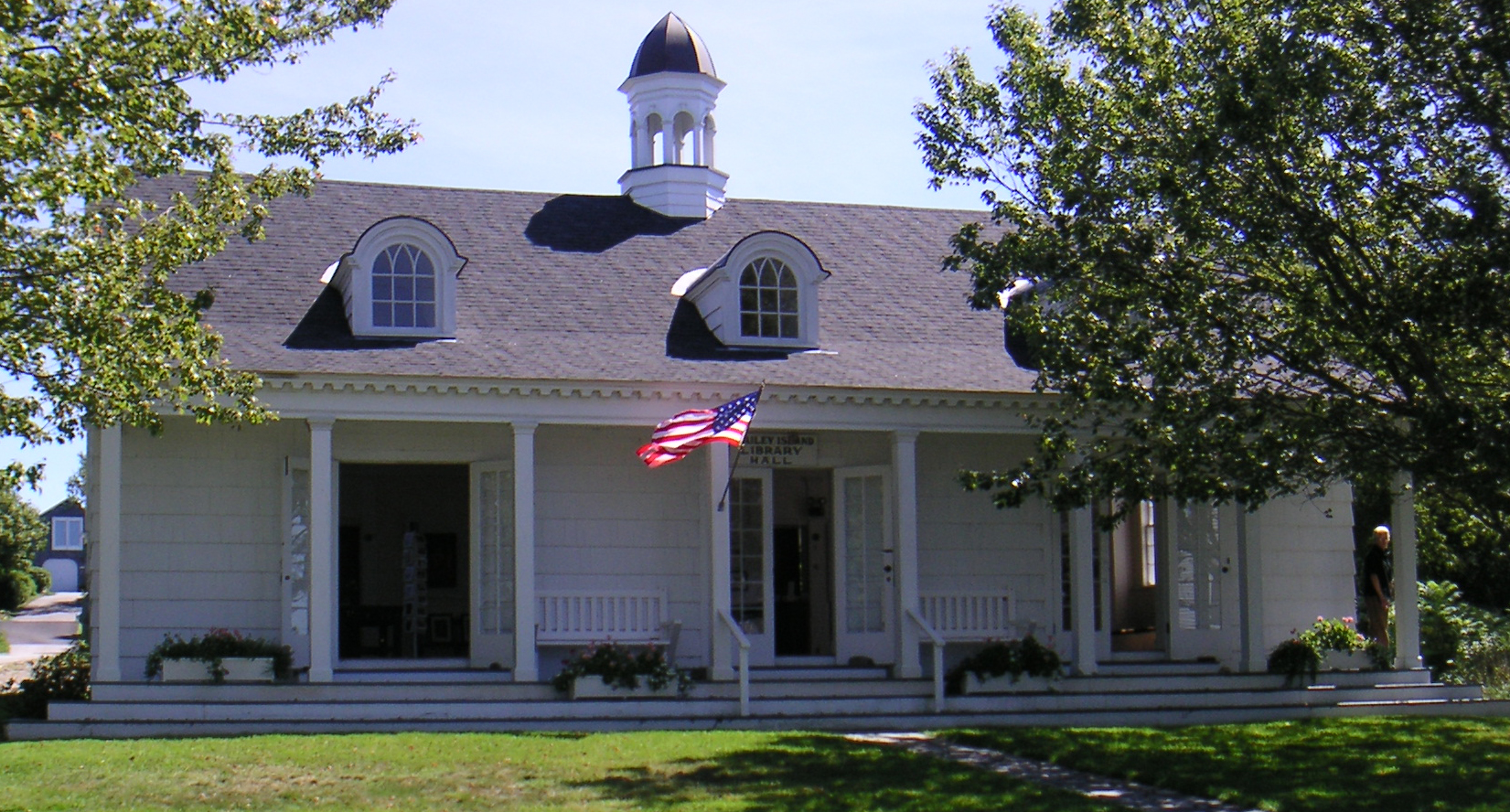

- Location within Maine
- Location: 2167 Harpswell Island Road, Harpswell, Maine
- Coordinates: 43°43′57″N 69°59′43″W
- Built: 1912
- NRHP reference No.: 08001253
- Added to NRHP: December 31, 2008

Bailey Island Library Hall (locally just Library Hall) is a historic community building at 2167 Harpswell Island Road, on Bailey Island in Harpswell, Maine. Built in 1911–12, it has been a center of community life on the island since its construction, and is a notable architectural work of the New York City architectural firm Mann & MacNeille. Originally built to house a lending library and social hall, it now only serves the latter function. It was listed on the National Register of Historic Places on December 31, 2008.

== Description and history ==
Library Hall is located roughly in the center of Bailey Island, on the east side of Harpswell Island Road (Maine State Route 24). It is a 1 1/2-story wood-frame structure, with a side-gable roof, clapboard siding, and a fieldstone foundation. A shed-roofed porch extends across the west side, supported by square posts with small capitals. The main facade has three pairs of French doors, evenly spaced, providing access to the hall, and there are three round-topped dormers in the main roof, which is capped by a small cupola with belfry. The east side of the building has a shed-roof ell extending across much of its width. Palladian windows are set on the building's north and south sides. The interior of the main block is a large hall, with the kitchen located in the rear ell. One end of the hall has a stage set under a proscenium arch.

The hall was designed by the New York City firm of Mann & MacNeille, whose principals, Horace Mann and Perry MacNeille, were both summer residents of Bailey Island. The design was made in 1909 and the hall was built in 1911–12. It was made as a conscious imitation of the main house at Mount Vernon in Virginia, reflecting the then-popular Georgian Revival in architecture. The building served as a model for later community hall buildings the architects designed for several industrial working-class communities.

The hall was built in part to provide a library to the local islanders, who were separated from the nearest library on Orr's Island by a ferry crossing that was not bridged until the construction in 1928 of the Bailey Island Bridge. The Mingo Club, a local social and literary society established in 1906 to manage a local lending library, was responsible for raising funds and maintaining the property. The hall was used for a wide variety of social functions, including lectures, dances, and concerts. Psychoanalyst Carl Jung gave his first seminar in America, on dreams, at Library Hall. By 1961 the Mingo Club's lending library had been discontinued; the hall continues to serve as a local event venue under the auspices of the Bailey Island Library Hall Association.

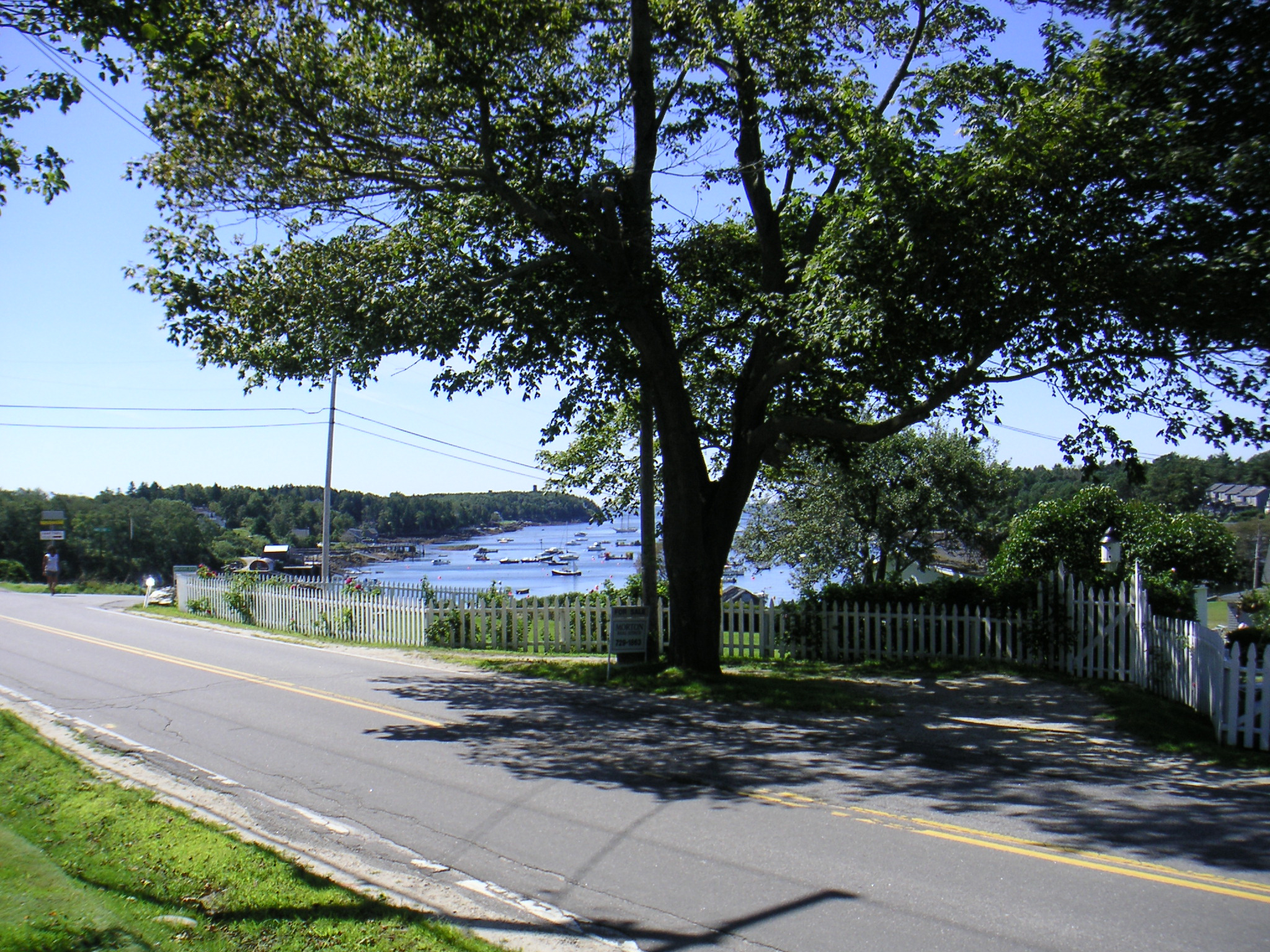
A view of Mackerel Cove across Rt. 24 from Library Hall

== See also ==
- National Register of Historic Places listings in Cumberland County, Maine
