= Bailey Island =

Bailey Island may refer to the following places in the United States:

- Bailey Island (Maine)
- Bailey Island (South Carolina)
