= Dingley Island =

Island in Cumberland County, Maine, United States

Coordinates: 43°48′58″N 69°53′02″W

Dingley Island is a Casco Bay island that is part of the town of Harpswell, Maine. Dingley Island is connected by bridge to Sebascodegan Island and by extension to mainland Harpswell and Brunswick.

As the case with other Casco Bay islands, Dingley Island has historic shell middens where Native Americans piled discarded shells. In the 1750s, the island was known as Bateman's Island, and later Indian Island. In 1788, Captain Levi Dingley purchased the south 50 acres (200,000 m^{2}) and in 1792 built a house there; it has been known as Dingley Island ever since.

In 1867, the Maine State Legislature approved construction of a bridge connecting Dingley and Sebascodegan islands.

At some point in the 19th century, an ice vendor excavated a pond on Dingley Island fed by underground spring water, and built a wooden conveyor system to move ice blocks during the winter months to a loading point for preservation in sawdust, shipment and sale or for storing seafood caught by Harpswell boats during transit to markets. An 1883 directory of Maine businesses listed the Dingley's Island Ice Co. as one of several operating that year in Harpswell. By the 1940s, Goddard Bros. Ice was supplying Portuguese schooners headed to the Grand Banks of Newfoundland for commercial fishing.

The 9.6 acre Goddard Pond on Dingley Island is the second largest body of fresh water in Harpswell.

A causeway was subsequently built with a 12-foot bridge connecting the island to Sebascodegan Island, also known as Great Island. In 1949, the Maine State Legislature authorized the Dingley Island causeway to be filled in and the bridge removed, with the result of blocking tidal flows between Dingley and Sebascodegan islands.

Over time, the 200-foot causeway resulted in an accumulation of silt in Dingley Cove, in the area adjacent to the causeway, and by the mid 1990s the silt threatened to turn the area into a salt marsh. Such a transformation would have significantly reduced the important clam harvest in this area and had a deleterious effect on associated livelihoods. The island's 45 acres (180,000 m^{2}) of clam flats generate an average annual harvest of some $225,000.

In response to this growing environmental concern, residents and neighbors of Dingley Island began in 1996 to investigate the possibility of replacing a portion of the causeway with a bridge that would allow the restoration of normal tidal flows to the cove. Over the next several years, various partners were brought on board, including the Town of Harpswell, the US Navy Innovative Readiness Training Program (IRT), Bowdoin College students and faculty, the New Meadows River Watershed Project, the Maine Corporate Wetlands Restoration Partnership and the National Oceanic and Atmospheric Administration. These partners, led by Harpswell resident Elsa Martz, worked together to develop and finance the bridge construction project, which cost approximately $174,000. On October 1, 2003, the community and its partners, along with Governor John Baldacci, celebrated the opening of the new bridge.

The Dingley Island bridge and causeway averaged 120 vehicle crossings daily as of January 2025.

In a January 2024 storm, an 83-foot sardine boat called Jacob Pike sank at its New Meadows River mooring off Dingley Island, resulting in fuel and oil leaking into the surrounding water. The U.S. Coast Guard raised the vessel and removed it the following August.

== Notable people ==
- Thomas Moser, furniture designer

== See also ==
- List of islands of Maine
