= Union Hotel (Cundy's Harbor, Maine) =

- U.S. National Register of Historic Places
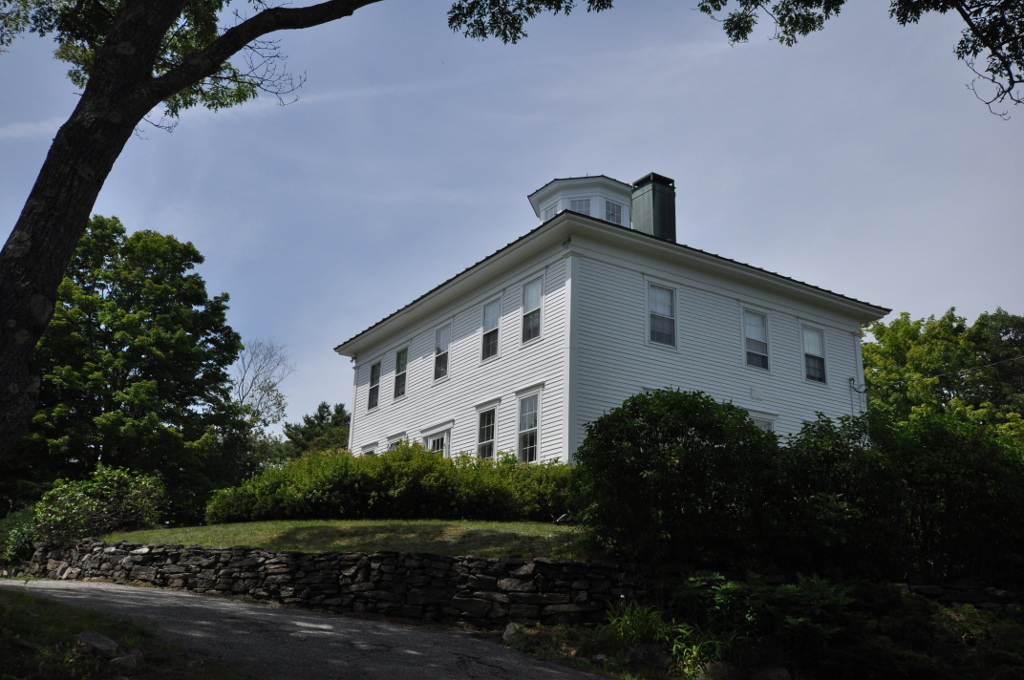

- Location within Maine Location within the United States
- Location: 926 Cundy's Harbor Rd., Cundy's Harbor, Harpswell, Maine
- Coordinates: 43°47′32″N 69°53′36″W
- Area: 1.8 acres (0.73 ha)
- Built: 1862
- Architectural style: Italianate, Vernacular Classical
- NRHP reference No.: 85002179
- Added to NRHP: September 12, 1985

The Union Hotel is a historic hotel building at 926 Cundy's Harbor Road in the Cundy's Harbor village of Harpswell, Maine. Built in 1862, it is believed to be the oldest purpose-built summer resort hotel in the state. It was listed on the National Register of Historic Places in 1985. It now houses the Captain's Watch Bed and Breakfast.

== Description and history ==
The Union Hotel building stands atop a rise in the village of Cundy's Harbor, located near the southeastern tip of Sebascodegan Island, which forms the eastern part of the town of Harpswell. The building, which looks like a large house, stands on the west side of Cundy's Harbor Road, just north of the village library. It is a two-story wood frame structure, with a hip roof and clapboard siding. The roof is topped at its center by an octagonal cupola. The building trim is a vernacular Italianate style, with corner pilasters rising to a broad entablature, and deep eaves. Early photos of the building show that it once had roof balustrades and a porch.

The Union Hotel was built in 1862 by Daniel Weeks Simpson, a native of nearby Brunswick who married into a local family. It is believed to be the oldest resort hotel building in the state; an earlier instance in Harpswell, built in 1835, was destroyed by fire in 1868. Simpson's hotel was a financial failure, and the building has seen a variety of uses over the years. In the 19th century, in addition to several stints as a hotel, it as house a local school and church, and in the 20th century it was converted into a private residence. It now houses the Captain's Watch, a bed and breakfast inn.

== See also ==
- National Register of Historic Places listings in Cumberland County, Maine
