= Manu Chatterjee =

American physician (1920–2007)

- Born: October 19, 1920; Worcester, Massachusetts, U.S.
- Died: November 19, 2007 (aged 87); Harpswell, Maine, U.S.
- Occupation: Physician

Manu Chatterjee (October 19, 1920 – November 19, 2007) was an American physician. He was noted for expanding the clinical-research capabilities in Maine, as well as improving health-care technology in the state and overseas.

== Early life ==
Chatterjee was born in 1920 in Worcester, Massachusetts, to Manmatha Nath and Margaret Kilpatrick. His father was Indian-born.

He graduated Olivet College in Michigan, before undertaking studies at Antioch College in Ohio. (His father had worked for 30 years at the latter as professor of social sciences.) At Case Western Reserve University School of Medicine in Ohio, he attained an M.S. in clinical psychology and an M.D. After completing a residency in internal medicine at Mary Imogene Bassett Hospital in Cooperstown, New York, in 1994, Chatterjee undertook a Fellowship in cardiology at the University of California Hospitals in San Francisco.

== Career ==
Between 1943 and 1947, before and after World War II, he was a lieutenant on the LST-671, in roles as an executive officer and navigator. He received three battle stars for the Asiatic-Pacific Theater and two for the Philippine Liberation, as well as the World War II Victory Medal.

In 1955, he established the Merrymeeting Medical Group in Brunswick, Maine, which was the state's first group practice. He practiced there until 1967, then in a limited capacity for the next fourteen years. He was involved in developing Maine Medical Center's clinical-research capabilities and its open-heart surgery program. He was its Director of Clinical Research between 1961 and 1965.

Between 1964 and 1968, he was Chief of Staff and Chief of Medicine at Brunswick's Regional Memorial Hospital. During his final year there, he was appointed executive director of the newly created Medical Care Development (MCD), which, via the Regional Medical Program, received federal funding to improve health-care technology and procedures to rural locations such as Maine.

With offices on Water Street in Augusta, Maine, and Washington, D.C., Chatterjee formed an international division of MCD, with the intention of expanding healthcare demonstrations to developing nations.

He left MCD in 1981 and became an independent health-care consultant, while also working with The Texas Heart Institute and Project HOPE.

== Personal life ==
Chatterjee married Katherine, with whom he had a son and daughter. He had a stepson and stepdaughter from his wife's previous marriage. Katherine was noted for being the first woman elected to the Harpswell Select Board.

== Death ==
Chatterjee died at his home in Harpswell in 2007, aged 87. He is interred in Maine Veterans Memorial Cemetery in Augusta. His widow died in 2025.
