= Donna McNeil =

American arts advocate, author and curator (born 1940s)

- Born: 1940s Würzburg, Germany
- Education: University of Syracuse BFA; Harvard MLA
- Occupations: Arts advocate, author, and curator
- Honours: Maine College of Art honorary PhD

Donna McNeil (born 1940s) (Note: born in 1946 or 1947. (She was aged 70 in 2017.)) is an American arts advocate, author, and curator. She is the founding executive director of the Ellis-Beauregard Foundation and the former director of the Maine Arts Commission.

== Early life and education ==
McNeil was born in Würzburg, Germany. She was educated at Syracuse University, where she earned a bachelor of fine arts in painting and Harvard University, where she earned a Master of Arts in liberal studies focused on art history. She holds an honorary Ph.D. in Fine Arts from the Maine College of Art.

== Career ==
She was the co-director of Artists in Context and the former executive director of the Maine Arts Commission. She has served as a juror for the National Endowment for the Arts and MacArthur Foundation.

She is the author of the 2017 book There Has to Be Magic: The Art of Evelyn Kok, which won the Excellence in Publishing award at the Maine Literary Awards in 2018. She also wrote Moser: Legacy in Wood about the Thos. Moser company, published in 2015.

Since 2017, McNeil has served as the executive founding director of the Ellis-Beauregard Foundation, an arts grant and residency in Rockland, Maine.

== Books ==
- There Has to Be Magic: The Art of Evelyn Kok, Maine Authors Publishing, 2017
- Donna McNeil & Thomas Moser, Moser: Legacy in Wood, Down East Books, ISBN 978-1-60893-607-6, 2015

== Personal life ==
McNeil has spoken in support of reproductive freedom, describing her own experience with a pre-Roe v. Wade abortion in 1965.
