= Orr's Island =

Island in Cumberland County, Maine, United States

Coordinates: 43.770°N 69.965°W

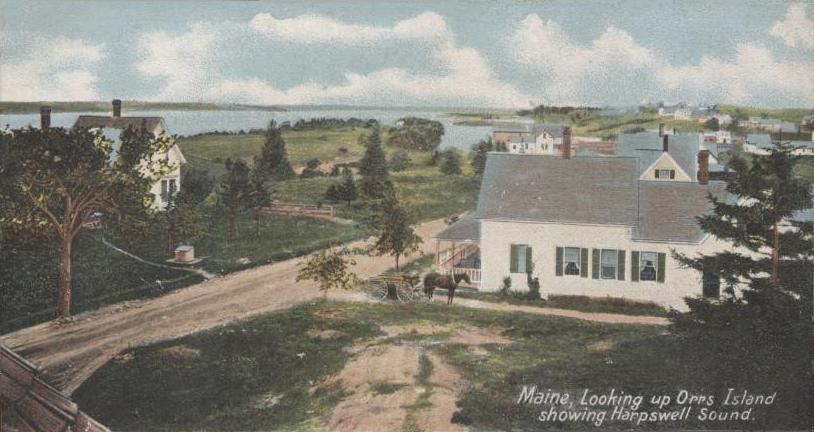
Orr's Island in 1906

Orr's Island is an island in Casco Bay and the Gulf of Maine, part of the Atlantic Ocean. The island is within the town of Harpswell, Maine, United States. Harriet Beecher Stowe lived briefly on Orr's Island, and used it as the inspiration and setting for her 1861 novel The Pearl of Orr's Island.

== Geography ==
Orr's Island forms an archipelago with narrow channels separating it from Sebascodegan Island to the north and Bailey Island to the south, along with other smaller islands nearby.

With much of its length flanked by Harpswell Sound and Gun Point Cove, Orr's Island is connected to Bailey Island by the Bailey Island Bridge, also known as the Cribstone Bridge, and to Sebascodegan Island by the Orr's Island Bridge. Known alternatively as Great Island, Sebascodegan Island has bridges connecting the three islands to mainland Harpswell to the west and Brunswick to the north.

== Demographics ==
As of 2010, Orr's Island had an estimated population of 539 people. 48.8% of the population was male, and 51.2% of the population was female. 98.3% of the population was white, 0.7% was Asian, 0.9% was two or more races, and 0.3% was some other race. Additionally, 90.2% of the population was 18 years or older, 32.7% was 65 years or older, and 1.7% was under 5 years of age.

== History ==
Native American shellfish middens at the northern end of Orr's Island date back to the 13th century, with the Androscoggin people known to have lived on Casco Bay islands in warmer stretches of the year to fish, hunt and forage.

By the 18th century, colonial settlers had arrived on what was known at the time as Little Sebascodegan Island, the name derived from an Abenaki word translating to "carry". In 1659, Kittery's Nicholas Shapleigh acquired Harpswell Neck—at the time called Merriconeag Neck—and nearby islands, which his heirs sold in 1684 to Richard Wharton of Boston.

North Yarmouth had been incorporated four years earlier by the Massachusetts General Court, with its boundaries including Harpswell and surrounding islands.

After Wharton's death, his mainland and island holdings were purchased in 1714 by an investment group called the Pejepscot Proprietors, which began selling off parcels to settlers. In 1742, brothers Joseph and Clement Orr of Pemaquid, who were turners by trade, purchased about 390 acres on Merriconeag Neck. The following year, North Yarmouth settler Richard Jaques bought 100 acres on Little Sebascodegan Island. At some point in the following years, ownership of the large majority of Little Sebascodegan Island transferred to Elisha Cook and William Tailer, who sold it in 1748 to Joseph Orr.

In 1749, the Massachusetts General Court created a North Yarmouth precinct that included Harpswell, Little Sebascodegan and other islands.

The Orr brothers began felling trees and shipping wood to Boston for sale. By 1764, they built a blockhouse at the center of what became known as Orr's Island. Around that time after Timothy Bailey's purchase of Will's Island immediately south which would become Bailey Island, inhabitant William Black relocated to Orr's Island. The channel spanned by the Bailey Island Bridge is known today as Will's Gut.

Construction of an Orr's Island schoolhouse was approved in 1791, which was open as well to students from Bailey Island.

A bridge connecting Orr's and Sebascodegan islands was built between 1833 and 1845, and donated to the town of Harpswell in 1852. Destroyed four years later, the bridge was rebuilt.

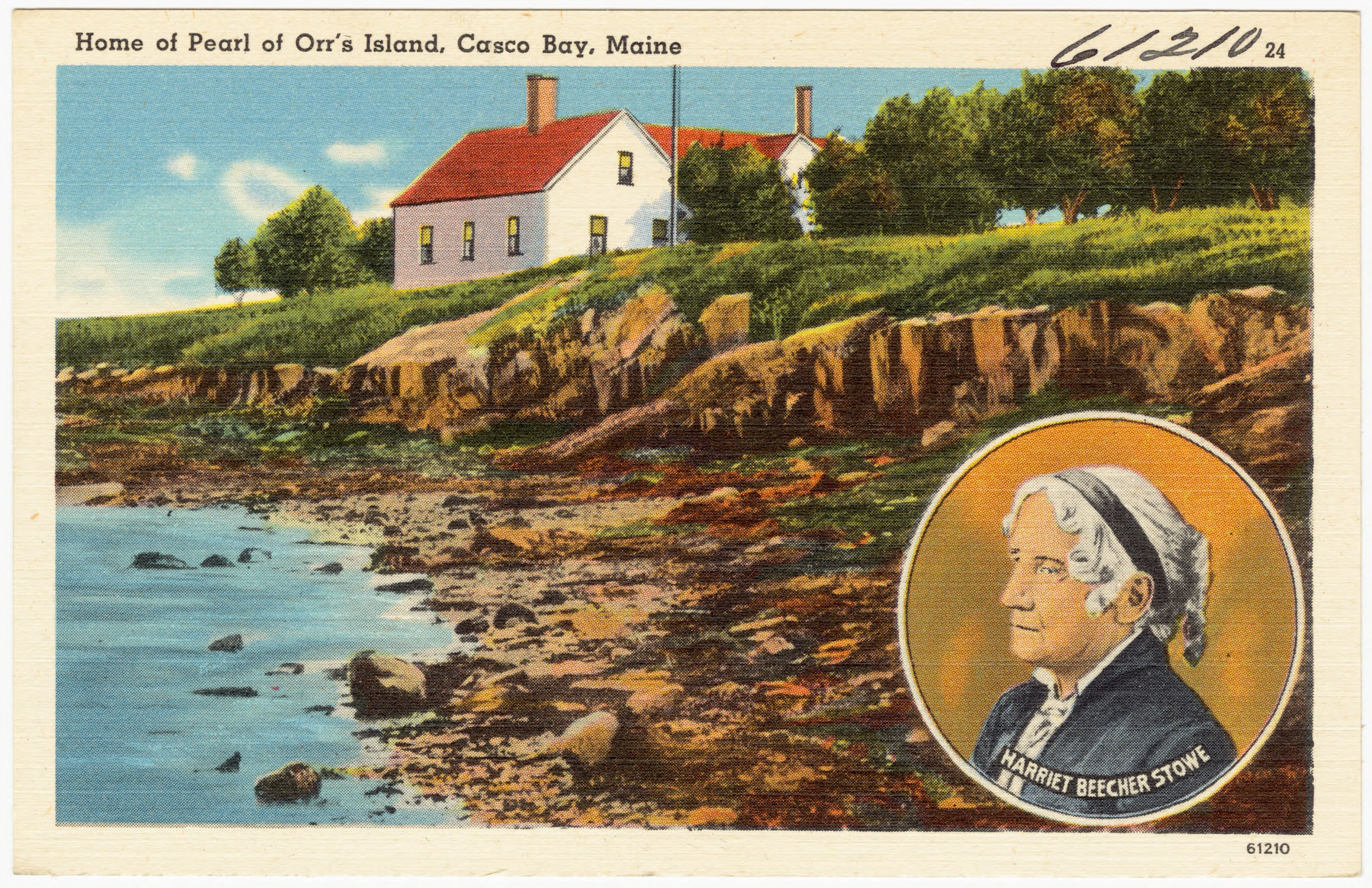
A vintage postcard depicting the cottage thought to be an inspiration for the Harriet Beecher Stowe novel The Pearl of Orr's Island, on Orr's Island in Harpswell, Maine.

In 1850, Harriet Beecher Stowe moved to Brunswick with husband Calvin Ellis Stowe after he accepted a professorship at Bowdoin College. During their time in Maine, the Stowe's rented a cottage on Orr's Island, which provided Harriet background material for the serialized novel The Pearl of Orr's Island published in 1861.

The novel resulted in increased number of tourists visiting Orr's Island and other Casco Bay islands. Over time on Orr's Island, "Pearl" experiences would come to include home tours, reenactors, clambakes, sailboat excursions, and a "smuggler's cave" attraction, along with island lodgings.

The Orr's Island Meeting House was built in 1855 or 1856 as a house of worship that would serve several religious denominations over time. The building was added in 2022 to the National Register of Historic Places, as an example of a small, modest rural church building with almost no embellishment which retains "high integrity" in the words of Maine Historic Preservation Commission.

The Orr's Island Post Office opened in 1868, with the U.S. Postal Service designating the island's ZIP Code in 1963 as 04066.

With an initial collection of 300 volumes, the Orr's Island Library was established in 1900. Housed initially at the Orr's Island Post Office, the Orr's Island Library would get its own building in 1905 which remains in use today.

The Bailey Island Bridge, known alternatively as the Cribstone Bridge, was completed in 1928 connecting Orr's and Bailey islands over Will's Gut. Inspired by a Scotland bridge designed to minimize any obstruction to tidal currents below, Bailey Island Bridge designer Llewelyn N. Edwards chose a cribstone layout. The Scotland bridge was destroyed in World War II, making the Bailey Island Bridge the last remaining cribstone bridge in the world.

After a fire destroyed a small building in 1934 that was used during construction of a replacement Orr's Island Bridge, an Orr's Island Fire Department was organized that formally incorporated in 1941. A 1986 merger with its Bailey Island counterpart created today's Orr's and Bailey Islands Fire Department.

In June 2024, a humpback whale carcass floated into Will's Gut, drawing bystanders on the shore and on the Bailey Island Bridge. The dead animal was loaded into a truck and transported to an inland farm for burial and composting.

The Bailey Island Bridge was the inspiration for the architectural design of an academic building on Portland's waterfront, which was under construction as of 2025.

Bailey Island Bridge traffic averaged more than 2,250 vehicles a day as of January 2025, with the Orr's Island Bridge averaging nearly 3,100 vehicles daily.

Bowdoin College operates a 118-acre (48 ha) coastal studies center on Orr's Island.

== In arts and popular culture ==
- Harriet Beecher Stowe published her novel The Pearl of Orr's Island in 1861.
- John Greenleaf Whittier was inspired to write his 1866 poem "The Dead Ship of Harpswell" based on a legend of Orr's Island.
- William Jasper Nicolls published his novel Brunhilda of Orr’s Island in 1908.
- Orr's Island is the setting for the story in the 2000 American sci-fi horror movie They Nest.

== Utilities ==
Orr's Island, like the rest of Harpswell is served power by Central Maine Power. There is no public water or sewer on the island, with most households having septic systems and drilled wells. Communications providers include Cribstone Communications, Consolidated Communications and Comcast.

== See also ==
- List of islands of Maine
