= Maine Arts Commission =

Government agency in Maine which is involved in the arts

The Maine Arts Commission is a state agency that assists artists and arts organizations in bringing music, dance, poetry, painting and other arts activities into the lives of people in Maine.

== History ==
The idea of Maine state arts support began in 1933 when the Maine State Legislature created the Maine Art Commission, a three-member board appointed by the governor. The Commission advised the governor about the acquisition of works of art for state buildings. This entity lasted until a movement in the 1960s to create a permanent state agency in support of the arts and humanities.

In 1964, Governor John H. Reed created the Governor's Council on Arts and Culture in Maine. The council made recommendations on what role the state government should play in support of the arts and humanities, and ultimately recommended the creation of an independent state agency, the Maine State Commission on the Arts and Humanities. Concurrent with this development in Maine, and in part driving it, a movement in Washington, D.C., created the National Endowment for the Arts (NEA) and the National Endowment for the Humanities (NEH) as part of the National Foundation on the Arts & Humanities.

The Maine State Commission on the Arts and Humanities, the NEA, and the NEH were established in 1965 and became active in 1966. When the commission was established, its mission was to expand support for the arts in the state. It was one of the only two state agencies in the country dedicated to supporting freedom of artistic expression in this way at the time.

In 2003 Donna McNeil began her work with the Maine Arts Commission. In 2009 she was named as the organization's director. McNeil retired in 2013.
