= Crow Island, Harpswell, Maine =

Island in Maine, United States

Coordinates: 43°50′54″N 69°58′56″W

Crow Island is a small island in Casco Bay and part of the town of Harpswell, Maine. Crow Island is notable for being owned in the early 20th century by Joshua Chamberlain, a Civil War hero who went on to serve as governor of Maine.

== Geography ==
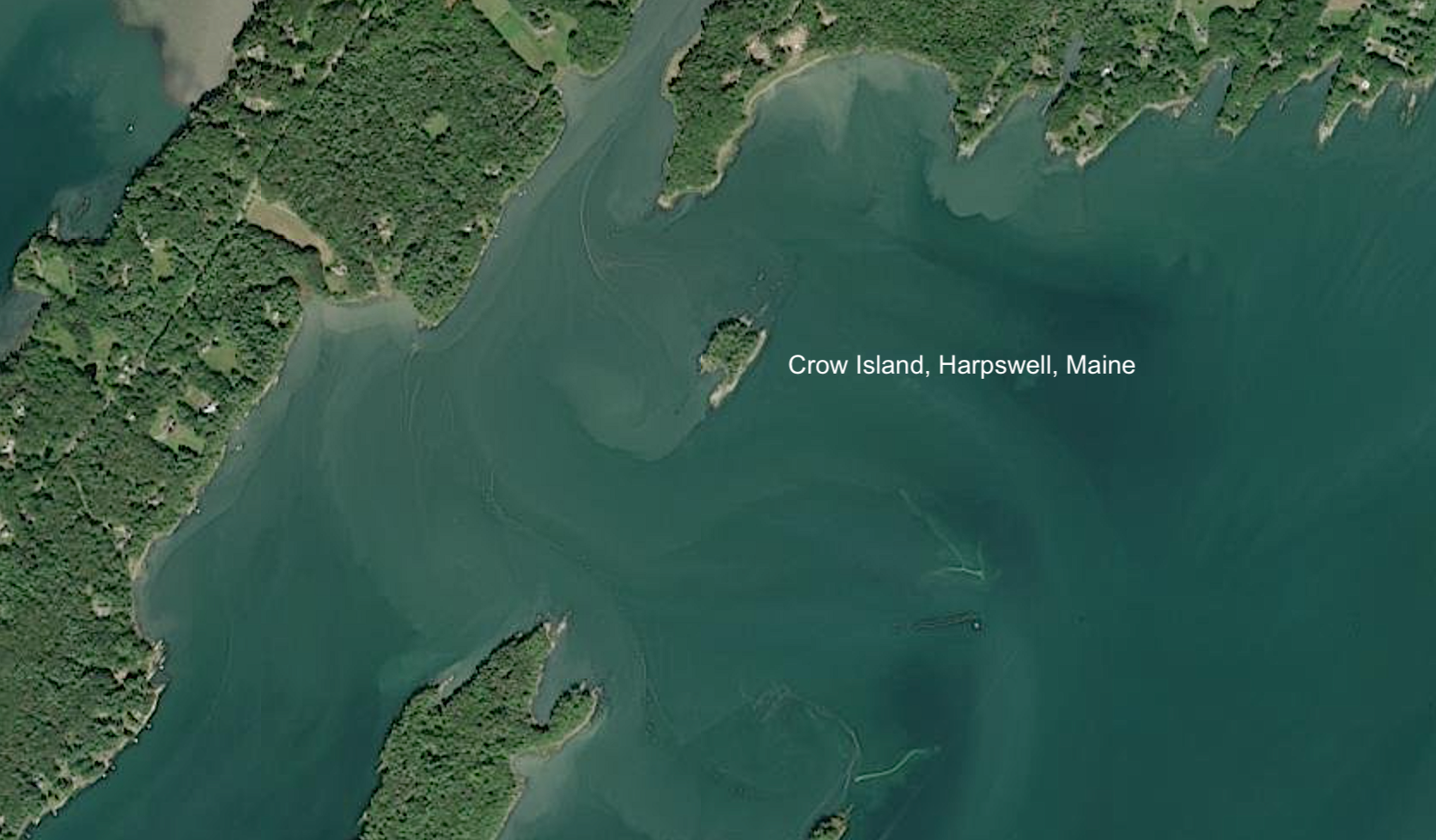
A U.S. Geological Survey satellite image of Crow Island.

Crow Island is located in the northern junction of Middle Bay and Merepoint Bay, just north of White Island and Scrag Island. Crow Island totals just over three acres, and is surrounded by extensive mudflats at low tide.

The Maine State Legislature included Crow Island as part of Harpswell in a statute enacted in 1998 that defined the boundaries of Brunswick and Harpswell.

It is one of multiple Casco Bay islands named Crow Island, including two that are part of the island municipality of Long Island.

== History ==
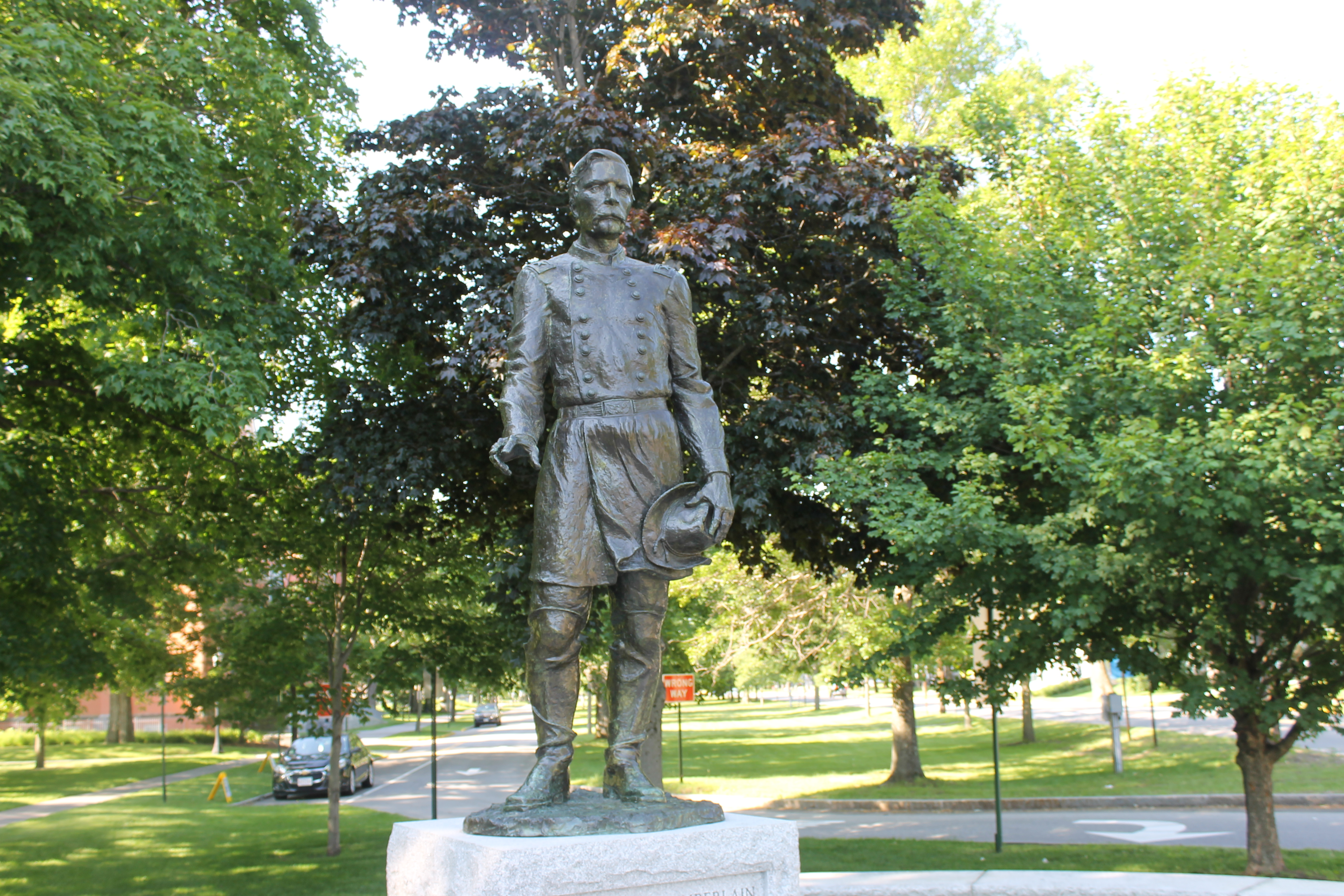
Joshua L. Chamberlain by sculptor Joseph Query in Brunswick, Maine.

With Chamberlain's Domhegan estate in Brunswick having a view of Crow Island, Chamberlain purchased the island in 1901.

The Harpswell Heritage Land Trust was donated Crow Island in December 2002, with the town of Harpswell appraising the island's value at about $164,000 as of 2024.

Crow Island is one of a number of islands that are located with the Maquoit and Middle Bay Focus Area of Ecological Significance, designated by the state of Maine for habitat features that include intertidal mudflats and eelgrass beds, and wildlife including bald eagles and seabirds.

The intertidal areas in the immediate vicinity of Crow Island have been sites for suspended aquaculture commercial enterprises, including for the cultivation of oysters, quahogs and clams. The Crow Island area has also been a commercial fishing ground for seine boats catching menhaden, and for recreational fishing for striped bass.

Crow Island is included on the Maine Island Trail.

== See also ==
- List of islands of Maine
