= Harpswell Coastal Academy =

Location
- Harpswell, Maine; United States; 43.758039°N 70.014690°W

Information
- Type: Charter School
- Opened: September, 2013
- Closed: June, 2023
- Division 1 Principal: Amy Marx
- Division 2 Principal: Amy Marx
- Grades: 5-12
- Colors: Navy Blue, Orange
- Mascot: Narwhal
- Website: harpswellcoastalacademy.org

Harpswell Coastal Academy was a charter school serving grades 5–12 with a campus located in Harpswell, Maine. The school was funded by the State of Maine. It was one of nine school districts in the state to receive federal funding under the Rethinking Remote Education Venture.
