= Dolphin Marina and Restaurant =

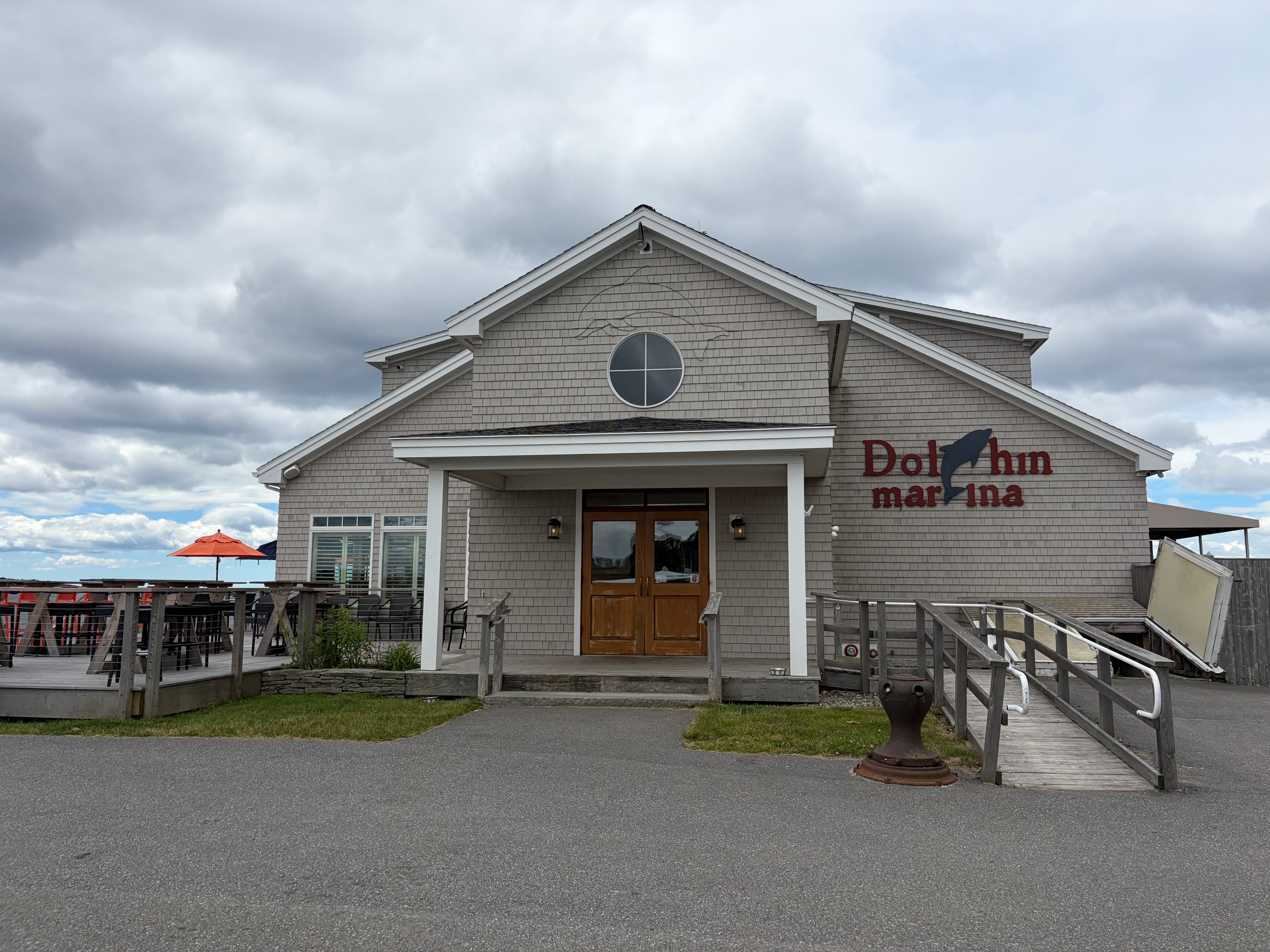
- 2026
- Interactive map of Dolphin Marina and Restaurant

Restaurant information
- Established: 1966 (60 years ago)
- Owners: Bill and Mimi Saxton
- Location: 515 Basin Point Road, Harpswell, Maine, Cumberland County, Maine, 04079, United States
- Coordinates: 43°44′21″N 70°02′30″W
- Website: www.thedolphin.me

The Dolphin Marina and Restaurant is a restaurant in South Harpswell, Maine, United States. Established in 1966 by Malcolm and Virginia "Jean" Saxton, at Basin Point, the restaurant overlooks Pott's Harbor and Casco Bay. As of 2026, the restaurant is owned by Malcom and Jean's son, Bill, and his wife, Mimi.

In 2019, Oprah Winfrey ate her first lobster roll at the restaurant during an episode of Oprah's Book Club.

The restaurant, which is open from April to November, was rebuilt in 2011, to a design by Texas architect Lou Kimball.

Rear of the building
