= Bailey Island (Maine) =

Island in the United States

Bailey Island, Maine
- Census-designated place
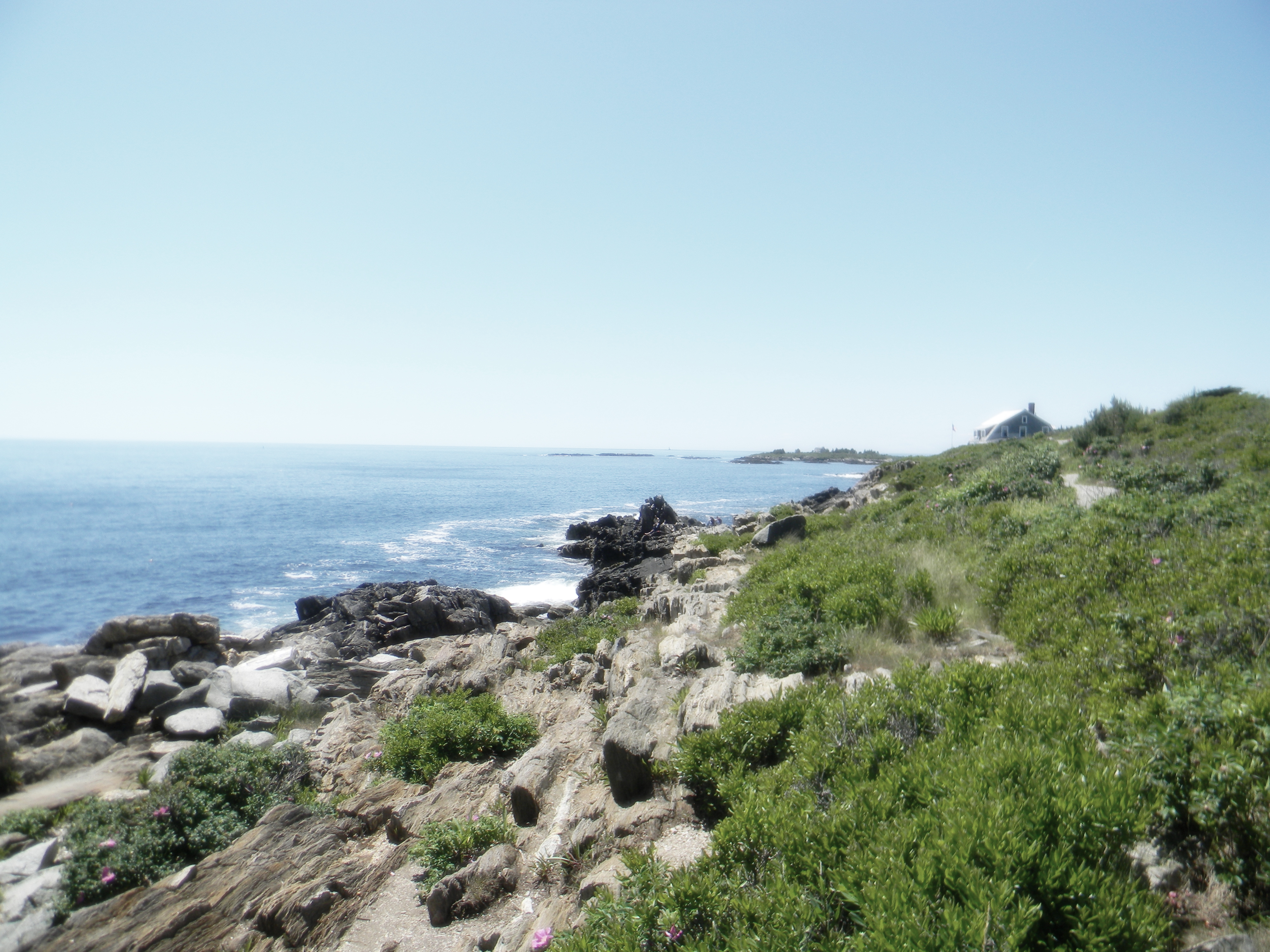
- Interactive map of Bailey Island, Maine
- Coordinates: 43°44′15″N 69°59′37″W
- Country: United States
- State: Maine
- County: Cumberland
- Town: Harpswell

Population (2020)
  - Total: 363
- Time zone: UTC-5 (Eastern (EST))
  - Summer (DST): UTC-4 (EDT)
- ZIP Code: 04003
- Area code: 207

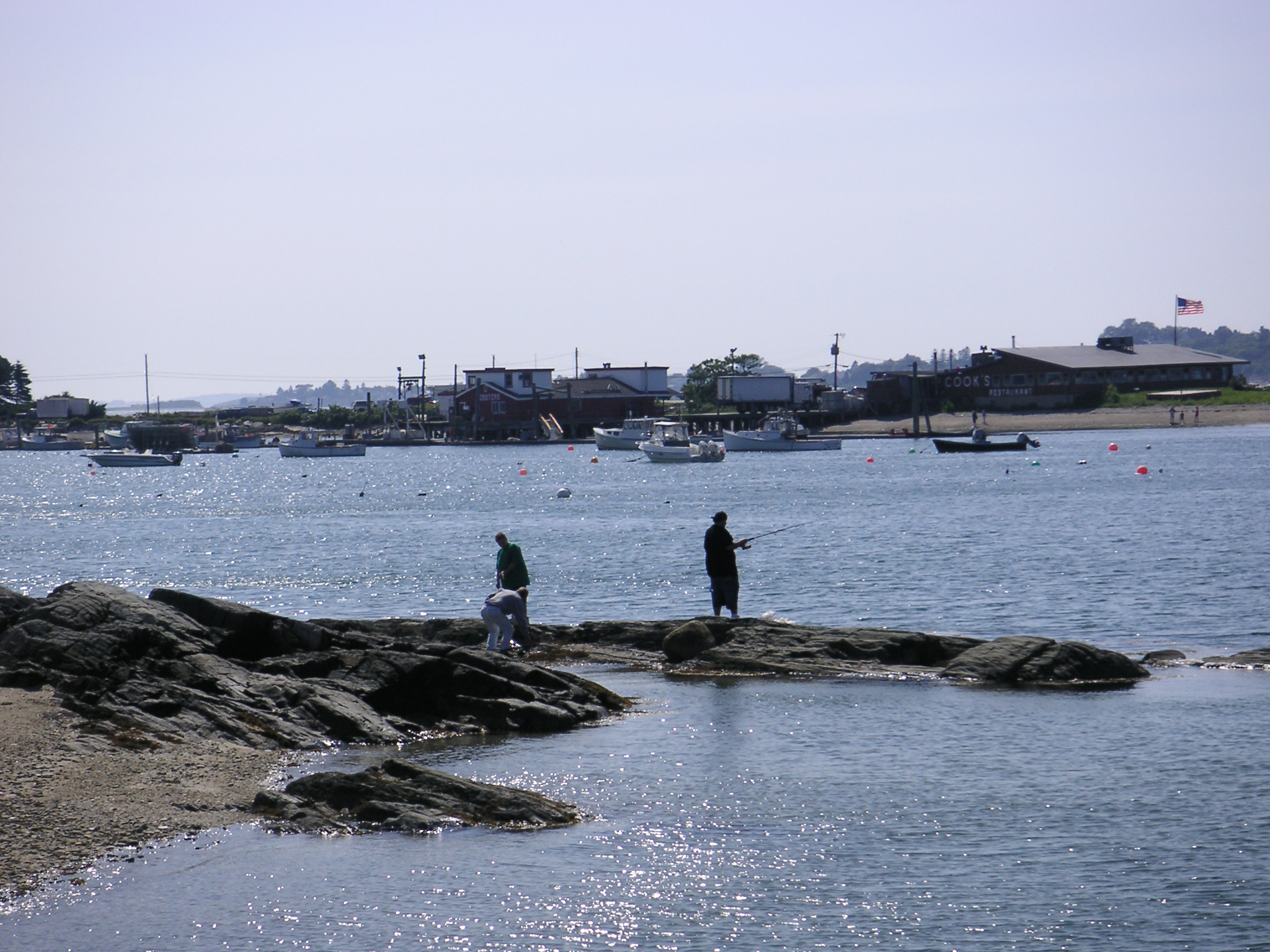
Will's Gut from Orr's Island

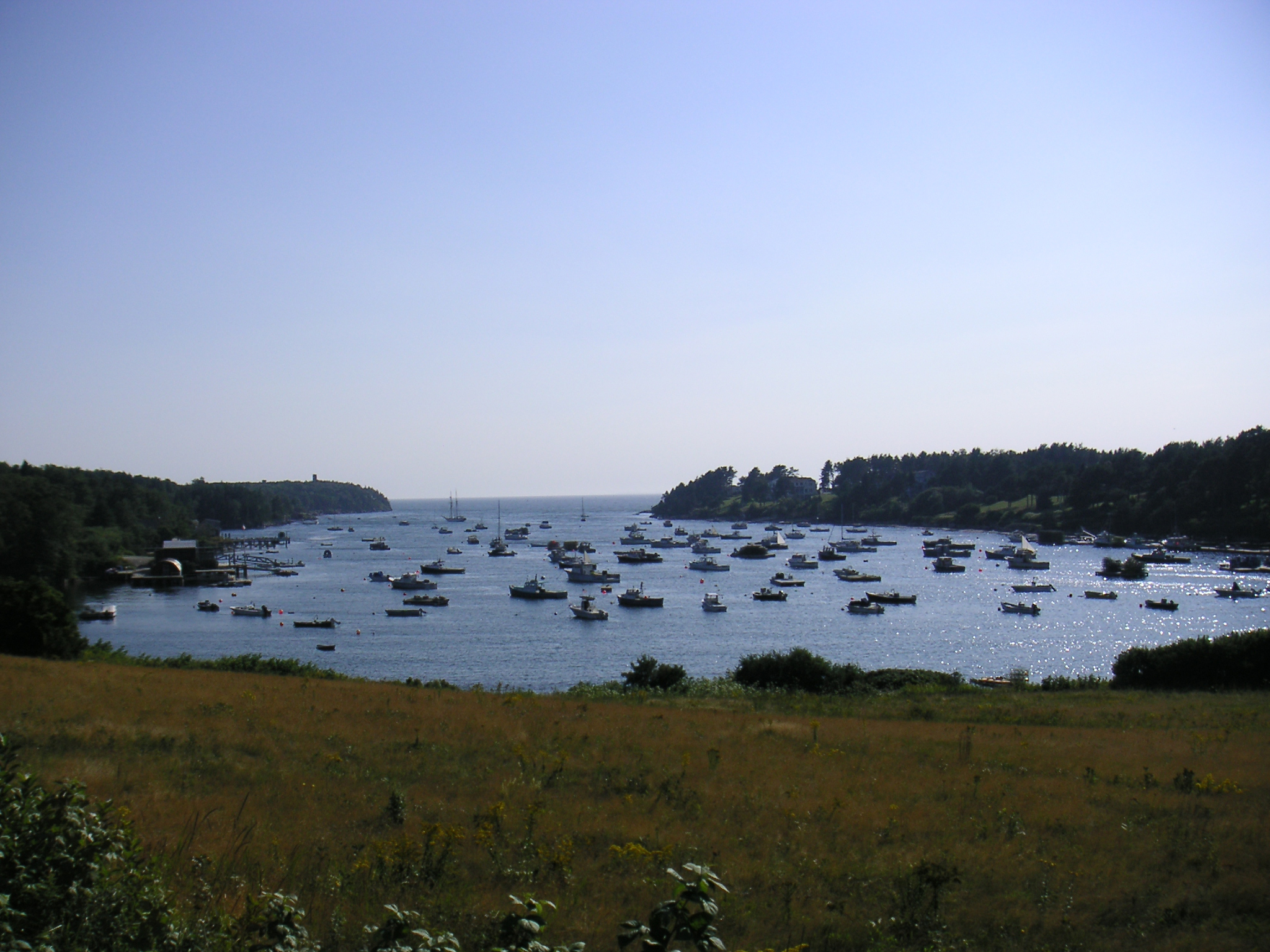
Lobster boats in Mackerel Cove on Bailey Island

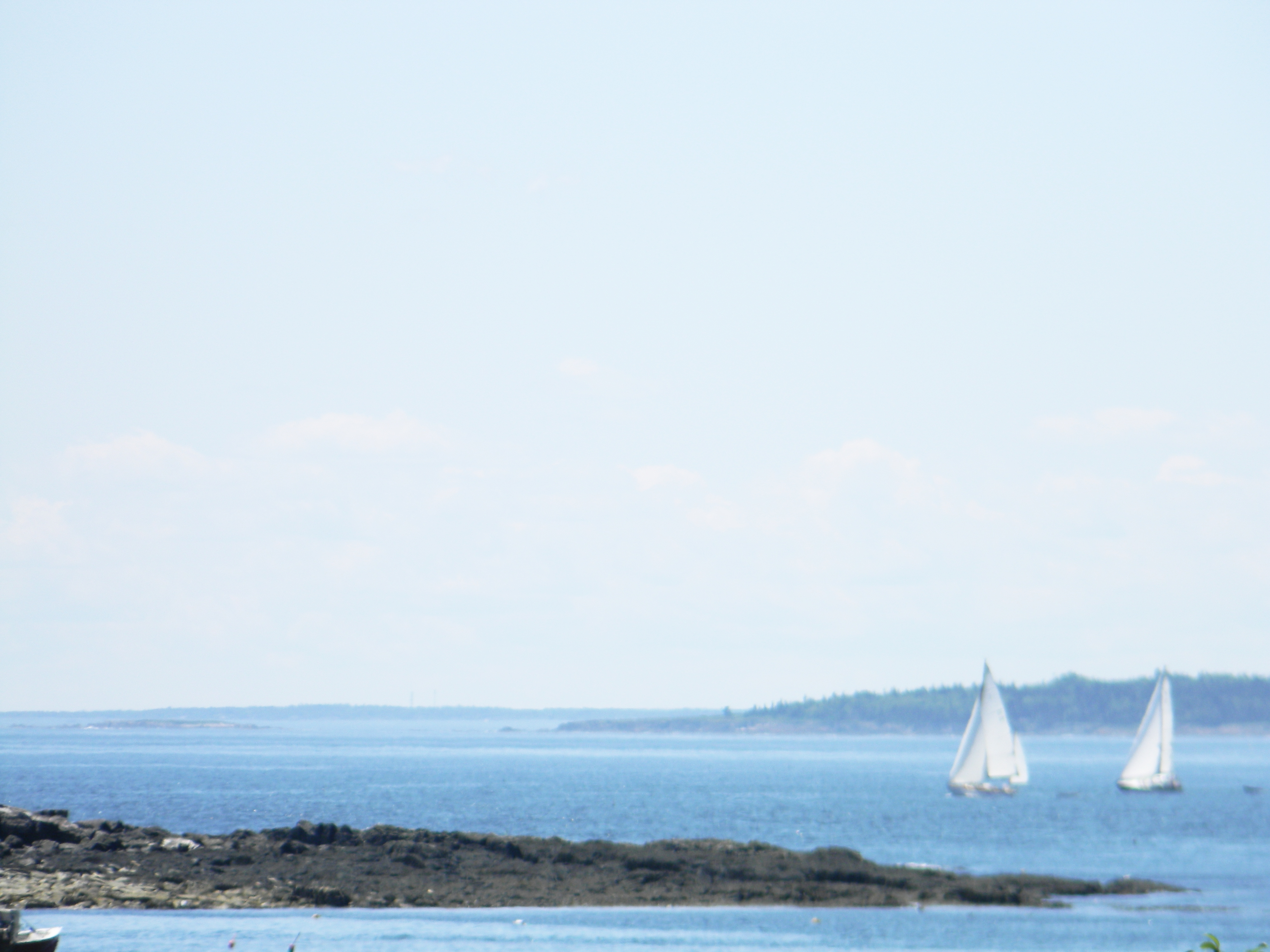
View of Casco Bay from Land's End

Bailey Island is an island in Casco Bay, and a part of the town of Harpswell, in Cumberland County, Maine, United States. As of the 2020 census, Bailey Island had a year-round population of 363 people.

== Geography ==
Bailey Island is part of an archipelago of islands extending into Casco Bay east of Harpswell Neck, including Orr's Island and Sebascodegan Island which are also part of the town of Harpswell. Bailey Island is nearly three miles long and less than a mile wide, with a rocky shoreline and multiple inlets.

== History ==
Bailey Island originally bore the name Newaggin, given to it by the local Abenaki Native Americans, and was first populated by European settlers in the 18th century.

Bailey Island's first settler was William Black, son of Black Will, who was a freed slave from Kittery. William sold the land his father had left him in the Upper Parish of Kittery and by 1727 settled permanently on Bailey Island. To Black's contemporaries, the island became known as Will's Island.

The story goes that in 1742, Reverend Timothy Bailey may have bought Will's Island for one pound of tobacco and a gallon of rum from William Black. In another variation of the story, the minister's wife liked the island, so the Baileys bribed municipal officials to find a flaw in Will's title to the island and award it to them. In any event, after Timothy Bailey and his wife took possession of the island, William Black left to live on Orr's Island. From then on, the island was known as Bailey Island.

As of July 1776, Bailey Island had nine structures according to a Royal Navy chart of Casco Bay.

With the 1861 publication of the Harriet Beecher Stowe novel The Pearl of Orr's Island, tourism interest spiked in Casco Bay islands. The novel resulted in increased number of tourists visiting Orr's Island and other Casco Bay islands, with hoteliers opening establishments on several including Bailey Island with the Ocean View Hotel.

In 1881, the Harpswell Line ferry service was established providing service to Bailey and Orr's islands, then merged in 1907 with the Casco Bay Steamboat Co. along with the Gurnet Steamboat Co., which initiated service in 1904 between Bailey Island and Gurnet Landing in Brunswick. The New Meadows Steamboat Co. launched in 1905 with runs between Bailey Island and wharves on the New Meadows River. With World War I impacting leisure spending and facing escalating costs to maintain its ferries, the Casco Bay & Harpswell Line declared bankruptcy in 1919 The company emerged from bankruptcy as Casco Bay Lines, and ran a Bailey Island cruise until 2020 when it was discontinued.

The Bailey Island Bridge, which spans Will's Gut and connects Bailey Island to Orr's Island, was completed in 1928. It is the only cribstone bridge in the world, after the destruction of a Scotland bridge in World War II that had inspired designer Llewelyn N. Edwards. The unique cribstone design of the bridge permits the substantial tides of that area to flow freely through it, greatly reducing the effect that flow would otherwise have on boats transiting its narrow channel opening.

Edmund Black became the first Maine native to win an Olympic medal, getting bronze in the hammer throw at the 1928 Summer Olympics in Amsterdam. Known as "Rip", Black grew up on Bailey Island and returned there where he worked a lobster boat until age 85.

In 1936, the analytical psychology pioneer Carl Jung delivered a set of lectures at Bailey Island Library Hall that got wide attention as his first in the United States of America.

The first installment of the Bailey Island Fishing Tournament was staged in 1939, awarding prizes for Atlantic bluefin tuna caught during the multi-day event.

The volunteer Bailey Island Fire Department formed in 1937, relying on signal horns that used a code system of short- and long-duration blares to indicate the general location of a blaze. In 1961, the department received a donation of its first ambulance from a Brunswick auto dealership. The department became part of the Orr and Bailey Islands Fire Department in 1986, with a new fire station built on Bailey Island in 2001.

On July 27, 2020, Bailey Island was the site of the only fatal shark attack in Maine's recorded history. A 63-year-old woman from New York City was fatally mauled by a confirmed great white shark while swimming with her daughter. She was only twenty yards from shore.

Bailey Island docks and wharves were damaged, some destroyed, in a pair of January 2024 storms that caused damage to more than half the docks in Harpswell. Wind-driven waves and astronomical high tides were sufficiently powerful to shift cribstones of the Bailey Island Bridge, requiring $1.5 million in repairs to reset cribstones to their original positions.

In June that year, the carcass of a humpback whale floated into Will's Gut, drawing bystanders on the shore and the Bailey Island Bridge. The dead animal was removed, loaded into a dump truck and transported to an inland farm to be composted.

In 2025, a design was chosen for a new academic building on Portland's waterfront that was inspired by the Bailey Island Bridge.

A Garrison Cove lobster facility on Bailey Island averages about 300,000 pounds of lobster for sale to restaurants and other buyers. In 2022, an Arizona company that offers drive-through restaurants for lobster rolls purchased a Mackerel Cove wharf to source lobster directly from local boats.

== Notable people ==
- Franklin P. Adams, writer
- Frank Aydelotte, academic
- Amy Ella Blanchard, writer
- Clara Louise Burnham, author
- Esther Harding, psychoanalyst
- Kristine Mann, psychoanalyst
- Holbrook Mann MacNeille, mathematician
- Anna Mann Richardson, psychoanalyst
- George Frederick Root, composer
- Ida Waugh, illustrator

== Landmarks ==
- The Bailey Island Bridge, thought to be the only cribstone bridge in the world;
- The Giant's Stairs (also known as "The Giant's Steps"), a coastal rock formation resembling a large flight of stairs;
- Land's End, a rocky beach at the end of the island;
- Mackerel Cove, a scenic working harbor;
- The Maine Lobsterman, a bronze statue originally created for the 1939 World's Fair;
- "The Nubble", an often-photographed bait shack where all the local lobstermen leave their buoys;
- Two World War II-era fire control towers near the southern tip of the island.
