= Harpswell Cattle Pound =

Stone enclosure in maine, USA

- Interactive map of Harpswell Cattle Pound
- 56°36′07″N 3°57′37″W
- Location: Harpswell, Maine, U.S.

The Harpswell Cattle Pound is a stone enclosure in Harpswell, Maine, United States. It was used to hold stray animals until they could be reunited with their owners. It was kept locked until the owners paid for the animals' release and it was determined that the animal had not caused any damage to local farmland.

It was built in 1793, and its remains are still visible as of 2023. Located on Harpswell Neck Road, the pound was one of the first built in New England.

A bronze plaque, donated by the Brunswick Rotary Club, was added to the site in 2023.
