= Birch Island, Maine =

Birch Island
- Census-designated place
- Location in Cumberland County and the state of Maine.
- Interactive map of Birch Island
- Coordinates: 43.8200°N 70.0067°W
- Country: United States
- State: Maine
- County: Cumberland
- Town: Harpswell
- Time zone: UTC-5 (Eastern (EST))
  - Summer (DST): UTC-4 (EDT)
- Area code: 207

Birch Island is an island and census-designated place (CDP) in the town of Harpswell, Maine, United States. It is part of the Portland–South Portland–Biddeford, Maine Metropolitan Statistical Area.

Birch Island is thought to have been among several in Casco Bay where indigenous people establish summer fishing camps. The first colonial settler homestead on Birch Island is believed to have been established in about 1740, with up to a dozen families living on Birch Island during the 19th century. A school was established that ran until 1845. By the end of the decade, many of the island's residents departed during the California gold rush.

== Geography ==
Birch Island is located in Casco Bay, west of the Harpswell Neck peninsula extending from Brunswick, which forms the southern bounds of Maquoit Bay.

Little Birch Island is located around 1,950 feet (590 m) northeast of Birch Island.

=== Norton Preserve ===
Norton Preserve, owned by Harpswell Heritage Land Trust and maintained by the Maine Island Trail Association, is located in the northeastern section of the island. It is named for conservationists Helen and Walter Norton. Walter died in May 2016, aged 91. Helen owns School House 1913, a restaurant in Harpswell.

== Publications ==
Richard F. Snow published A History of Birch Island in 1992.

== See also ==
- List of islands of Maine
