= Thos. Moser =

American furniture maker and woodworker

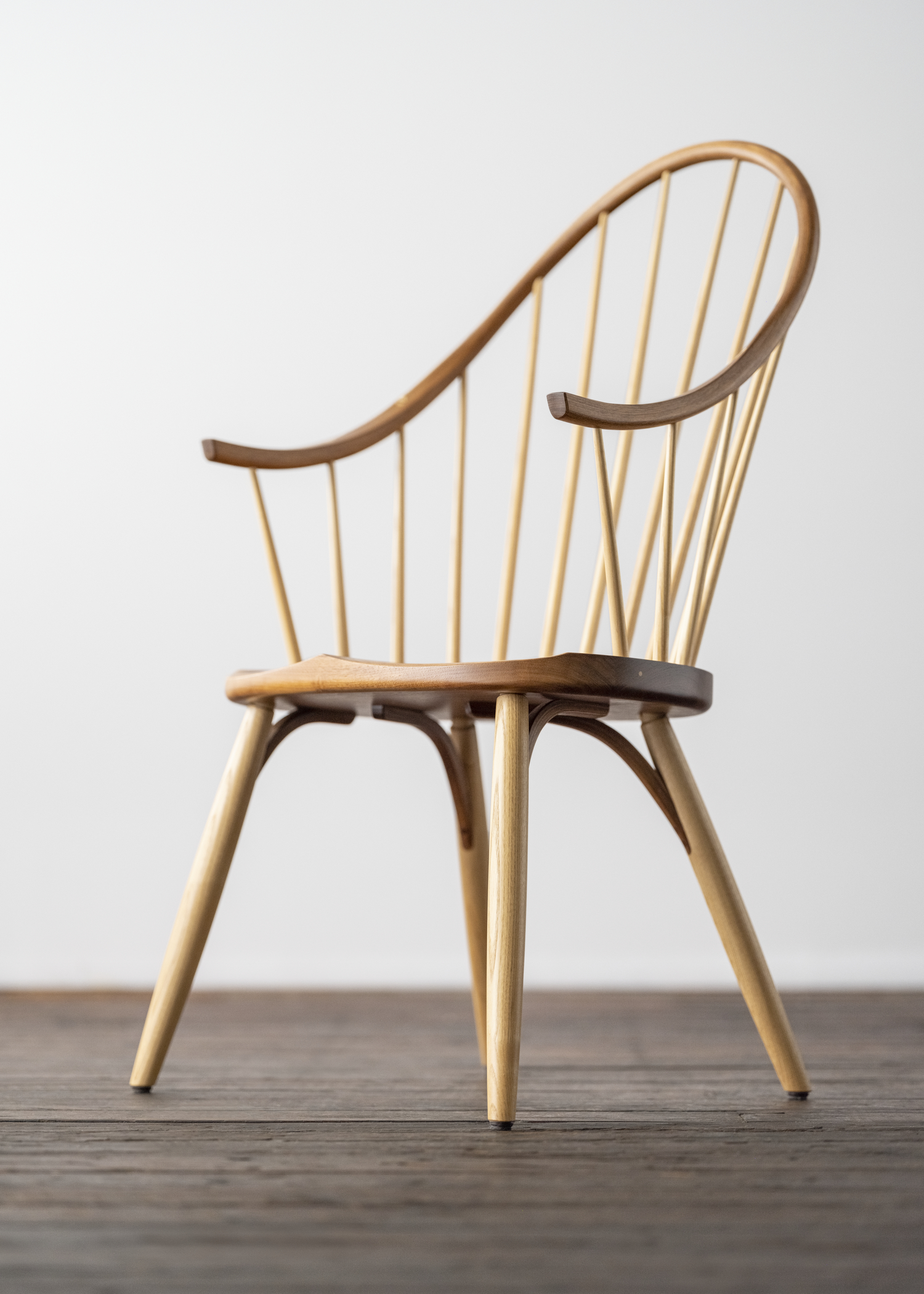
- A Moser Continuous Armchair
- Industry: Furniture making
- Founded: February 2, 1972 (54 years ago)
- Founders: Tom Moser; Mary Moser
- Headquarters: Auburn, Maine, U.S.
- Number of locations: 4
- Key people: Aaron Moser (president and CEO); Darrell Pardy (vice-president and COO)
- Owners: Aaron Moser
- Number of employees: 150 (approx.)
- Website: www.thosmoser.com

Thos. Moser (Note: Thos. is a traditional abbreviation for Thomas.) is a handmade-furniture company in Maine, United States. Founded by Thomas and Mary Moser in 1972, in New Gloucester, Maine, it has grown from a one-couple operation to employing around seventy craftsmen. Since 1987, the business has been based in Auburn, Maine, working out of a 90,000 square feet (8,400 m^{2}) workshop. It has showrooms in Freeport, Maine; Washington, D.C.; Boston, Massachusetts; and San Francisco, California. It formerly had showrooms in New York City and Philadelphia, Pennsylvania.

The company has designed and built furniture for the George W. Bush Presidential Center (in which it has fifty-five pieces), the Ronald Reagan Presidential Library, and has made ceremonial seating for Pope Benedict XVI and Pope Francis.

== History ==
Tom and Mary Moser established Thos. Moser on February 2, 1972, in a garage in New Gloucester, Maine. The company's first advertisement, placed in Down East Magazine, read:

Antiques are prized for their qualities of age, design and purity of craftsmanship. Our furniture is inspired by traditional design, constructed with pride and executed by hand, restoring a relationship between man and his practical art.

— Thos. Moser, Down East Magazine

Thos. Moser has produced a lectern for former President Bill Clinton, as well as a ceremonial seat for Pope Benedict XVI.

Aaron Moser took over the business in 2017.

In 2018, Thos. Moser collaborated with L.L.Bean to produce a limited-edition fly-tying desk.

In January 2025, the Moser family sold the company to Chenmark, a holding company in Portland, Maine.

== Tom Moser ==
Moser was born in Chicago, Illinois, in 1935. Raised in Northbrook, Illinois, Moser's father, Josef, was an Austrian immigrant. His mother died when Tom was fourteen; his father followed four years later, on Tom's eighteenth birthday. He had a brother, Joseph.

In 1957, his freshman year at college, he married Mary Wilson, with whom he had four sons: Aaron, Andrew, David and Matthew. The couple met when they were fourteen and twelve years old, respectively.

Moser was a United States Air Force veteran, having joined at the age of 18 after quitting high school. After serving four years in Greenland, he returned to his studies by attending the State University of New York. He went on to graduate school at the University of Michigan and at Cornell University, receiving a Doctor of Philosophy in speech communications.

After moving to Maine in 1966, Moser became a professor of language and speech pathology at the University of Maine in Orono, firstly, then at Bates College in Lewiston.

He wrote How to Build Shaker Furniture in 1977. He has also penned Windsor Chairmaking, Shop Drawings of American Furniture, Artistry in Wood and Legacy in Wood.

Moser's residences included Dingley Island in Harpswell, Maine, located in the New Meadows River section of Casco Bay.

Moser died in 2025 at the age of 90.
