= Water Street (Augusta, Maine) =

- U.S. National Register of Historic Places
- U.S. Historic district
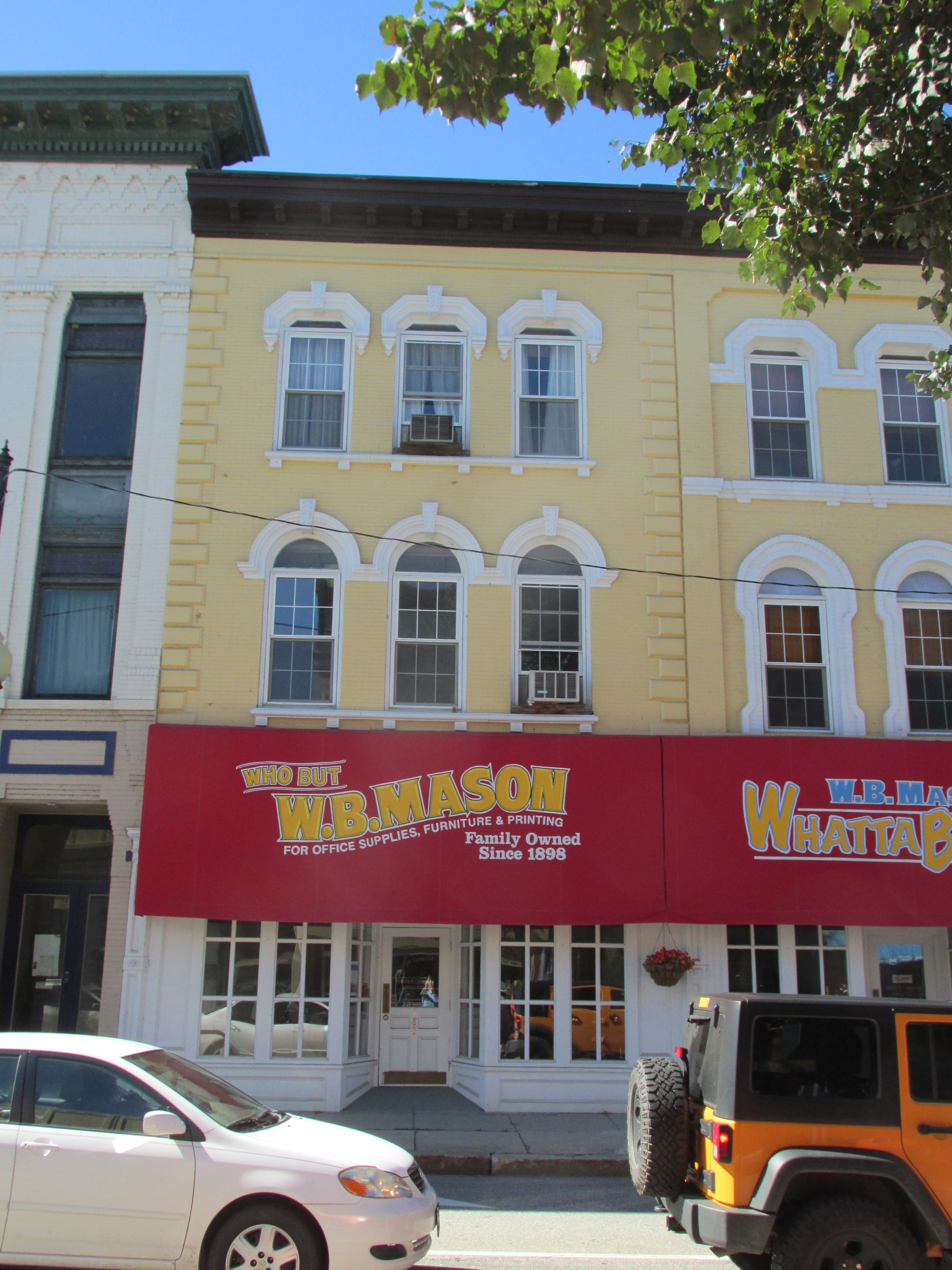
- 188 Water St.

- Location within Maine Location within the United States
- Location: 71-286 Water & 1 Winthrop Sts., Augusta, Maine
- Coordinates: 44°18′56″N 69°46′26″W
- Architect: Fassett, Francis H.; et al
- NRHP reference No.: 100000524
- Added to NRHP: January 17, 2017

Water Street is the location of the central business district of Augusta, Maine. Running parallel to the Kennebec River, Water Street was developed in the 19th century to serve an economy based on water transport and state services, and contains one of the city's highest concentrations of commercial architecture from that period. A portion of the street, running from Commercial Street in the north to the Old Post Office in the south, was listed on the National Register of Historic Places in 2017.

== See also ==
- National Register of Historic Places listings in Kennebec County, Maine
