= Bailey Island (South Carolina) =

Coordinates: 32.5454636°N 80.3581566°W

Bailey Island is an island in the U.S. state of South Carolina.

Bailey Island has the name of Dr. Ephraim Bailey and family, original owners of the site. A variant name is "Baileys Island".
