= Harpswell, Maine =

Town in Maine, United States

- Town
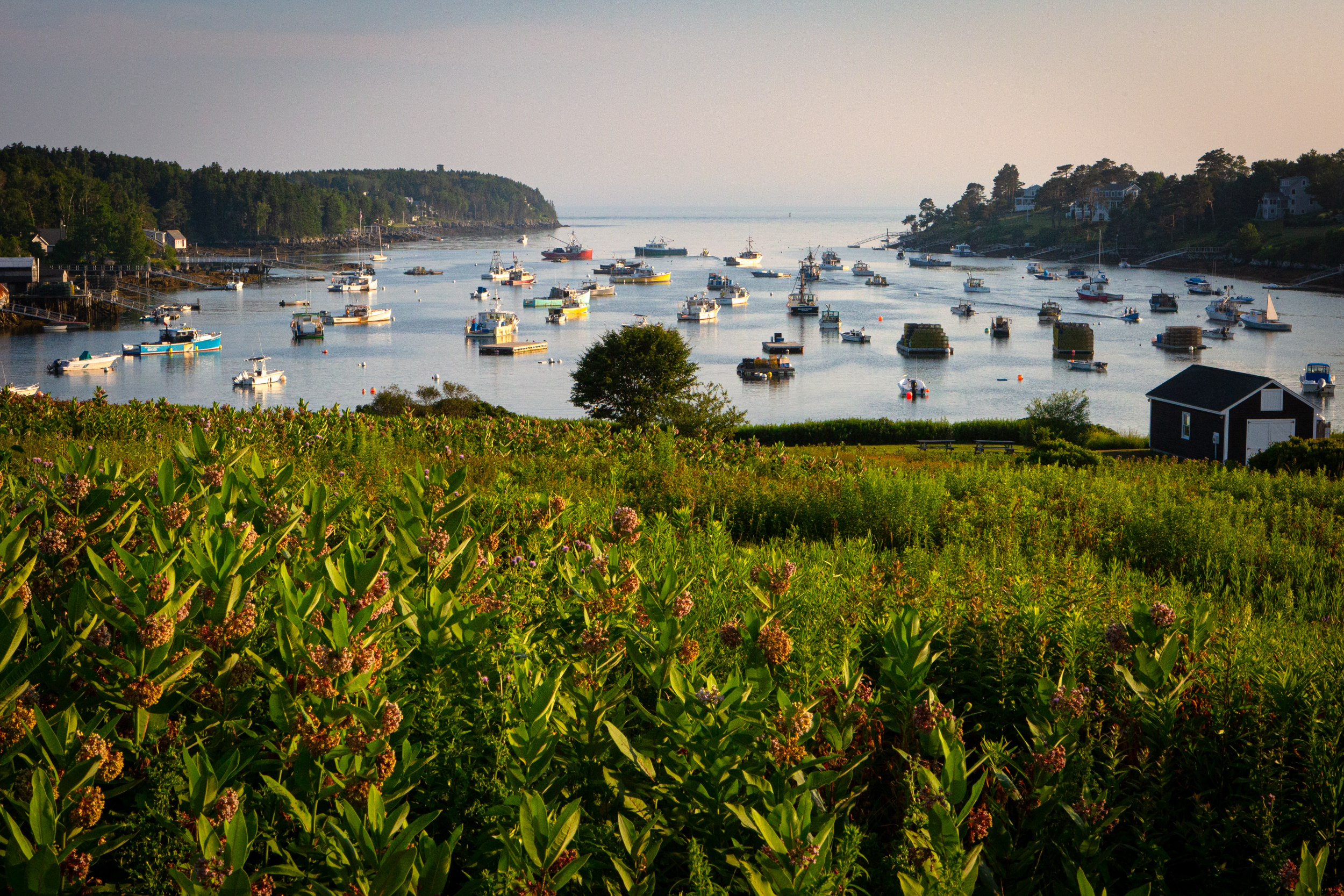
- Mackerel Cove, on Bailey Island.

- Seal

- Location in Cumberland County and the state of Maine.
- Coordinates: 43°46′50″N 69°57′52″W
- Country: United States
- State: Maine
- County: Cumberland
- Incorporated (district): 1758
- Incorporated (town): August 23, 1775
- Villages: Bailey Island; Cundy's Harbor; Harpswell Center; Dyer Cove; East Harpswell; North Harpswell; Orr's Island; South Harpswell; West Harpswell

Area
  - Total: 127.69 sq mi (330.72 km^{2})
  - Land: 24.18 sq mi (62.63 km^{2})
  - Water: 103.51 sq mi (268.09 km^{2})
- Elevation: 0 ft (0 m)

Population (2020)
  - Total: 5,031
  - Density: 208/sq mi (80.3/km^{2})
- Time zone: UTC-5 (Eastern (EST))
  - Summer (DST): UTC-4 (EDT)
- ZIP Codes: 04003 (Bailey Island); 04066 (Orr's Island); 04079 (Harpswell)
- Area code: 207 Exchange
- FIPS code: 23-31390
- GNIS feature ID: 582511
- Website: www.harpswell.maine.gov

Harpswell is a town in Cumberland County, Maine, United States, on Casco Bay in the Gulf of Maine. The population was 5,031 at the 2020 census.

Harpswell is composed of a peninsula contiguous with the rest of Cumberland County, called Harpswell Neck, as well as three large islands connected by bridges: Sebascodegan Island (locally known as Great Island), Orr's Island, and Bailey Island. Ninety-five smaller islands are within Harpswell's municipal borders.

About 40% of Harpswell jobs were linked directly to maritime occupations or indirectly through recreation and tourism, according to a 2014 study by the National Oceanic and Atmospheric Administration.

As of 2022, Harpswell had the highest number of active lobstering licenses in the state of Maine, at just over 250 in all.

== Geography ==
Harpswell is part of the Portland-South Portland metropolitan area as defined by the United States Census Bureau.

According to the Census Bureau, Harpswell has a total area of 127.69 square miles (330.72 km^{2}), of which 24.18 square miles (62.63 km^{2}) is land and 103.51 square miles (268.09 km^{2}) is water. Harpswell has about 216 miles (348 km) of coastline.

The town is crossed by state routes 24 and 123. It is bordered by the town of Brunswick to the north, and is separated by the New Meadows River from West Bath to the northeast and Phippsburg to the east.

== History ==
The Native Americans who originally inhabited Harpswell were Abenaki. The Abenaki name for Harpswell Neck, then called West Harpswell, was Merriconeag or "quick carrying place", a reference to the narrow peninsula's easy portage. The Abenaki name for Great Island was Erascohegan or Sebascodiggin, which became by the late 1800s Sebascodegan Island.

King James I awarded lands in present day Maine, including Casco Bay, in August 1622 to Ferdinando Gorges and John Mason, with Gorges and his cousin Thomas Gorges overseeing the award of land patents to settlers and other claimants.

In 1632, Thomas Purchase and George Way received a grant for Harpswell Neck, with Purchase already operating a trading post and fish salting operation on the Androscoggin River north of the peninsula.

As early as 1639, Francis Small of Kittery established a trading post at Sebascodegan Island under a commission from Kittery merchant Nicholas Shapleigh, who obtained land there via a deed with local Abenaki leaders.

After an Abenaki raid on his house during King Philip's War, Purchase abandoned his settlement and Boston merchant Richard Wharton acquired it in 1684 from the Abenaki. After Wharton's death, his heirs sold the land in 1714 to a group called the Pejepscot Proprietors.

Amid the continuing threat of Abenaki raids during an extended period of tensions in the early 18th century, attempts to settle the area were abandoned until after Dummer's War. The Treaty of 1725 brought a truce, and by 1731 many settlers had returned.

Formerly a part of North Yarmouth, in 1758 the town was incorporated by the Massachusetts General Court and named for Harpswell in Lincolnshire, England. Industries included farming, fishing and shipbuilding.

During the American Revolution, Harpswell farmer and mill owner Nathaniel Purinton organized a crew to attack a British privateer operating in the Casco Bay region, while serving as a lieutenant colonel of the Second Cumberland County Regiment. Sailing the 14-ton schooner America, Purinton intercepted the British gunboat Picaroon and captured it and a prize vessel Picaroon had taken.

During the 19th century, Harpswell became a significant shipbuilding center on Casco Bay, including a shipyard operated by George Skolfield which built the 1,200-ton barque John L. Dimmock.

In 1867, what was at the time the largest tide mill in Maine began operation, with water at high tide dammed at Basin Cove to power a grist mill as water was released during ebb tides. The mill operated until 1885, with the capacity to mill 50,000 bushels of grain annually. As many as 15 tide mills were built in Harpswell.

Arctic explorer Robert Peary purchased Sawungun Island off Harpswell Neck in 1881, and renamed it Eagle Island as his permanent home. The island is open to the public as the Eagle Island State Historic Site.

Also in 1881, the Casco Bay Steamboat Co. initiated Harpswell Line ferry service from Portland to Harpswell, including stops at Bailey and Orr's islands. In 1907, separate ferry lines were merged to create the Casco Bay and Harpswell Steamboat Co., a predecessor company to Casco Bay Lines.

In 1891, the Maine Legislature approved Harpswell's annexation of Ragged Island from Phippsburg.

After decades of interest on the part of Bailey Island residents, the Maine Legislature approved funding for a bridge to Orr's Island, with construction taking place in 1927 and 1928 under Llewelyn N. Edwards, bridge engineer for the Maine State Highway Commission. The Bailey Island Bridge today is a National Historic Civil Engineering Landmark.

In June 1941, an excursion boat embarked from Harpswell for Monhegan Island with 34 people aboard. Don was lost at sea with no survivors, and no conclusive evidence of what mishap it encountered. Given the large numbers aboard the 44-foot cabin cruiser, an investigation cited capsize in heavy swells as one possibility.

The U.S. Navy chose Harpswell for a jet fuel depot on the western shore to supply nearby Naval Air Station Brunswick via pipeline, with construction starting in 1953 for what would eventually become a 14-tank facility on 120 acres. In 2001, the federal government transferred the property to the town, which removed tanks and other infrastructure to create a public park.

The only fatal shark attack in Maine history occurred off of Bailey Island on July 27, 2020.

A pair of January 2024 storms damaged more than half the docks and piers in Harpswell, with some completely destroyed.

== Demographics ==
Historical population
Census	Pop.	Note	%±
1790	1,071		—
1800	1,049		−2.1%
1810	1,190		13.4%
1820	1,253		5.3%
1830	1,352		7.9%
1840	1,448		7.1%
1850	1,534		5.9%
1860	1,603		4.5%
1870	1,749		9.1%
1880	1,773		1.4%
1890	1,766		−0.4%
1900	1,750		−0.9%
1910	1,650		−5.7%
1920	1,242		−24.7%
1930	1,364		9.8%
1940	1,305		−4.3%
1950	1,644		26.0%
1960	2,032		23.6%
1970	2,552		25.6%
1980	3,796		48.7%
1990	5,012		32.0%
2000	5,239		4.5%
2010	4,740		−9.5%
2020	5,031		6.1%
U.S. Decennial Census

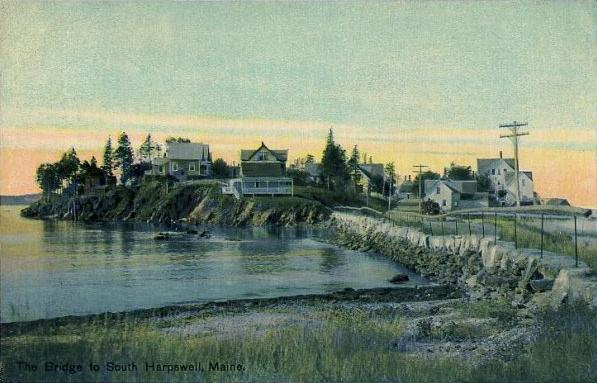
The causeway to Potts Point in 1914

=== 2010 census ===
As of the 2010 census, there were 4,740 people, 2,218 households, and 1,450 families living in the town. The population density was 196.0 inhabitants per square mile (75.7/km^{2}). There were 4,208 housing units at an average density of 174.0 per square mile (67.2/km^{2}). The racial makeup of the town was 97.7% White, 0.1% African American, 0.3% Native American, 0.6% Asian, 0.1% from other races, and 1.3% from two or more races. Hispanic or Latino of any race were 0.8% of the population.

There were 2,218 households, of which 19.1% had children under the age of 18 living with them, 55.3% were married couples living together, 6.4% had a female householder with no husband present, 3.7% had a male householder with no wife present, and 34.6% were non-families. 27.1% of all households were made up of individuals, and 12.8% had someone living alone who was 65 years of age or older. The average household size was 2.13 and the average family size was 2.53.

The median age in the town was 52.9 years. 15% of residents were under the age of 18; 4.7% were between the ages of 18 and 24; 16.9% were from 25 to 44; 37.5% were from 45 to 64; and 25.9% were 65 years of age or older. The gender makeup of the town was 48.4% male and 51.6% female.

=== 2000 census ===
As of the census of 2000, there were 5,239 people, 2,340 households, and 1,532 families living in the town. The population density was 216.7 inhabitants per square mile (83.7/km^{2}). There were 3,701 housing units at an average density of 153.1 per square mile (59.1/km^{2}). The racial makeup of the town was 97.94% White, 0.25% African American, 0.34% Native American, 0.55% Asian, 0.23% from other races, and 0.69% from two or more races. Hispanic or Latino of any race were 1.32% of the population.

There were 2,340 households, out of which 24.0% had children under the age of 18 living with them, 56.1% were married couples living together, 6.3% had a female householder with no husband present, and 34.5% were non-families. 27.3% of all households were made up of individuals, and 10.9% had someone living alone who was 65 years of age or older. The average household size was 2.24 and the average family size was 2.69.

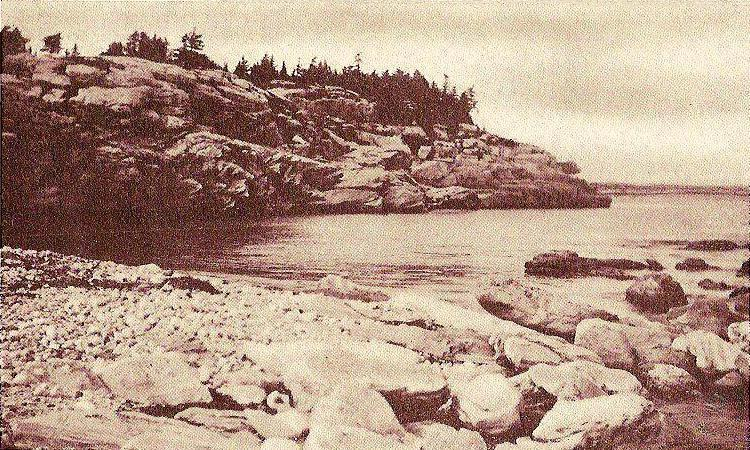
Ragged Island c. 1920

In the town, the population was spread out, with 19.6% under the age of 18, 4.9% from 18 to 24, 25.1% from 25 to 44, 31.7% from 45 to 64, and 18.8% who were 65 years of age or older. The median age was 45 years. For every 100 females, there were 96.1 males. For every 100 females age 18 and over, there were 93.3 males.

The median income for a household in the town was $40,611, and the median income for a family was $45,119. Males had a median income of $34,167 versus $30,000 for females. The per capita income for the town was $30,433. About 3.3% of families and 5.6% of the population were below the poverty line, including 6.8% of those under age 18 and 3.8% of those age 65 or over.

== Fire, EMS, police ==
Fire protection services are provided in Harpswell by three unique and nonrelated volunteer fire departments. All three departments provide EMS services and operate ambulances. A town contracted paramedic is stationed 24/7 at the town hall.

- Harpswell Neck Fire Department
- Orr's and Bailey Island Fire Department
- Cundy's Harbor Fire Department

Law enforcement services are provided by the Cumberland County Sheriff's Office.

== Education ==
Public schools in the area are operated by Maine School Administrative District 75. During the 2010–2011 school year, Harpswell residents voted to close the West Harpswell School, one of the town's two K–5 elementary schools. Beginning in 2011–2012, West Harpswell students were bused to the Harpswell Islands School, which was later renamed Harpswell Community School. Harpswell Coastal Academy, a charter school serving grades 6–12, opened in the old West Harpswell School in September 2013 and closed in June 2023. There is a private preschool, the Harpswell Nature School, residing within the Elijah Kellogg Church (not religiously affiliated) that was established in 2003 under the name Harpswell Community Nursery School, with four teachers and twenty-four students ages 3–5.

== In arts and popular culture ==
- Harriet Beecher Stowe published her novel The Pearl of Orr's Island in serialized form in 1861.
- John Greenleaf Whittier was inspired to write his 1866 poem "The Dead Ship of Harpswell" based on a legend of Orr's Island.
- Harpswell and surrounding islands inspired the settings for Elijah Kellogg's Elm Island series of children's books published between 1868 and 1870.
- William Jasper Nicolls published his novel Brunhilda of Orr's Island in 1908.
- The Edna St. Vincent Millay poem "Ragged Island" was published in 1954, four years after her death;
- Orr's Island is the setting for the 2000 horror film They Nest.
- The fictional murder mystery Blow the Man Down was filmed in Harpswell in 2018. The name of the town in the film is changed to Easter Cove, Maine.
- The Marvel Comics superhero Carol Danvers has a family home in Harpswell.

== Sites of interest ==
- The Bailey Island Bridge, thought to be the only cribstone bridge in the world;
- Cundy's Harbor, a historic coastal village on an East Harpswell peninsula near the mouth of the New Meadows River;
- The Eagle Island State Historic Site, summer home of Admiral Robert Peary;
- The Giant's Stairs (also known as "The Giant's Steps"), a coastal rock formation on Bailey Island resembling a large flight of stairs;
- The Harpswell Historical Society Museum and the adjacent Harpswell Cattle Pound;
- Land's End, a rocky beach at the tip of Bailey Island;
- Mackerel Cove, a scenic working harbor on Bailey Island;
- The Maine Lobsterman, a bronze statue at Land's End from a cast commissioned for the 1939 World's Fair;
- The Nubble, an often-photographed bait shack on Bailey Island with buoys of local lobstermen on display;
- Ragged Island, the summer home of poet Edna St. Vincent Millay;
- Two World War II-era fire control towers near the southern tip of Bailey Island.

== Harpswell islands ==
Major islands

- Bailey Island
- Dingley Island
- Orr's Island
- Sebascodegan Island

Minor islands

- Barnes Island
- Ben Island
- Big Hen Island
- Birch Island
- Bombazine Island
- Bragdon Island
- Center Island
- Crow Island
- Doughty Island
- Eagle Island
- East Brown Cow Island
- Elm Islands
- Flash Island
- Gallows Island
- George Island
- The Goslings
- Great Mark Island
- Haskell Island
- Hen Island
- Hopkins Island
- Horse Island
- Irony Island
- Jacquish Island
- Jenny Island
- Little Birch Island
- Little Island
- Little Mark Island
- Little Snow Island
- Little Whaleboat Island
- Little Yarmouth Island
- Long Island
- Long Point Island
- Lower Goose Island
- Mark Island
- Oak Island
- Pinkham Island
- Pole Island
- Pond Island
- Ragged Island
- Ram Island
- Raspberry Island
- Rogue Island
- Scrag Island
- Sheep Island
- Shelter Island
- Snow Island
- Strawberry Creek Island
- Three Islands
- Thrumcap
- Turnip Island
- Two Bush Island
- Uncle Zeke Island
- Upper Flag Island
- Upper Goose Island
- Whaleboat Island
- White Island
- White Bull Island
- Wyer Island
- Yarmouth Island

== Notable people ==
- Frank Aydelotte, academic
- Amy Ella Blanchard, author
- Clara Louise Burnham, author
- Manu Chatterjee, physician
- John Chryssavgis, author, theologian
- Robert P. Tristram Coffin, poet
- Patrick Dempsey, actor
- Stephen M. Etnier, artist
- Cheryl Golek, politician
- Esther Harding, psychoanalyst
- Richard Jacques, military officer
- Elijah Kellogg, minister, lecturer, author
- Hilton Kramer, art critic, essayist
- Kristine Mann, psychoanalyst
- Samuel Merritt, physician, businessman, mayor, regent
- Edna St. Vincent Millay, poet
- Dodge Morgan, sailor, businessman, and publisher
- Thomas Moser, furniture designer
- James L. Nelson, novelist
- Robert Peary, explorer
- Alexander Petrunkevitch, Yale professor and arachnologist
- Thomas Purchase, settler
- Anna Mann Richardson, psychoanalyst
- George Frederick Root, composer
- Francis Small, settler
- Harriet Beecher Stowe, author
- Ida Waugh, illustrator

== See also ==
- Dolphin Marina and Restaurant
