= Sebascodegan Island =

Island in Cumberland County, Maine, United States

Coordinates: 43°49′54″N 69°55′09″W

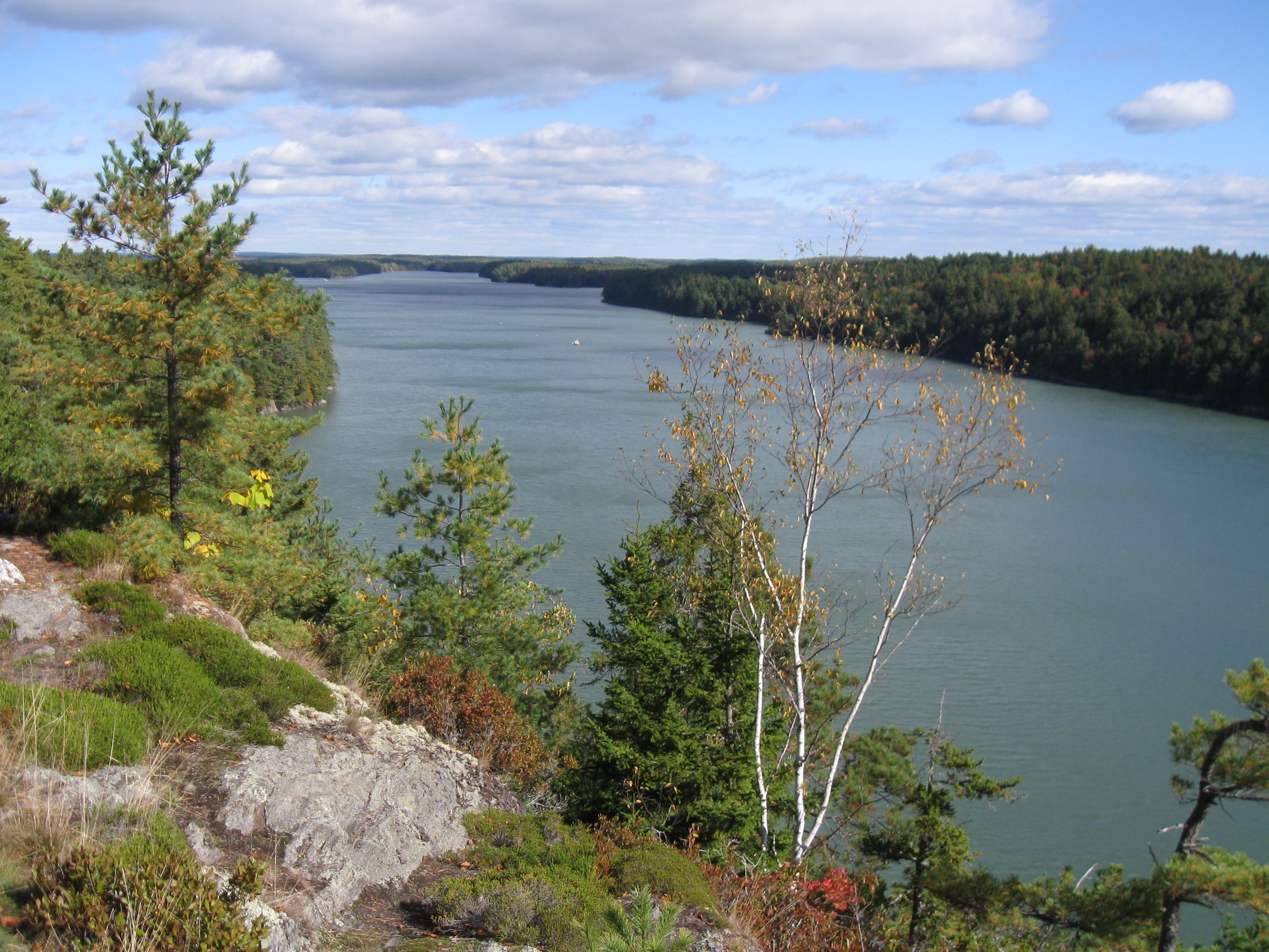
The inlet known as Long Reach nearly splits Sebascodegan Island in two.

Sebascodegan Island, alternatively known as Great Island, is the largest island in Casco Bay and part of the town of Harpswell, Maine.

With the island's name derived from an Abenaki word for "carry", in the 17th century Sebascodegan Island was crossed with trails used by the Androscoggin people for overland portage of canoes. In about 1659, Nicholas Shapleigh of Kittery established a settlement on Harpswell Neck and Sebascodegan Island, about 20 years after Kittery's' Francis Small had established a trading camp on the island.

Harpswell and Sebascodegan Island became part of North Yarmouth when the town was incorporated in 1680. In 1749, the Massachusetts General Court created a North Yarmouth precinct covering Harpswell, Sebascodegan and other islands, then in 1758 approved the incorporation of that precinct as the Town of Harpswell.

William Condy, among Sebascodegan's early settlers, arrived in 1733 at the site that would become known as Cundy's Harbor on the southeastern side of Sebascodegan Island. Cundy's Harbor is one of five villages in Harpswell today and is thought to be the oldest lobstering community in Maine.

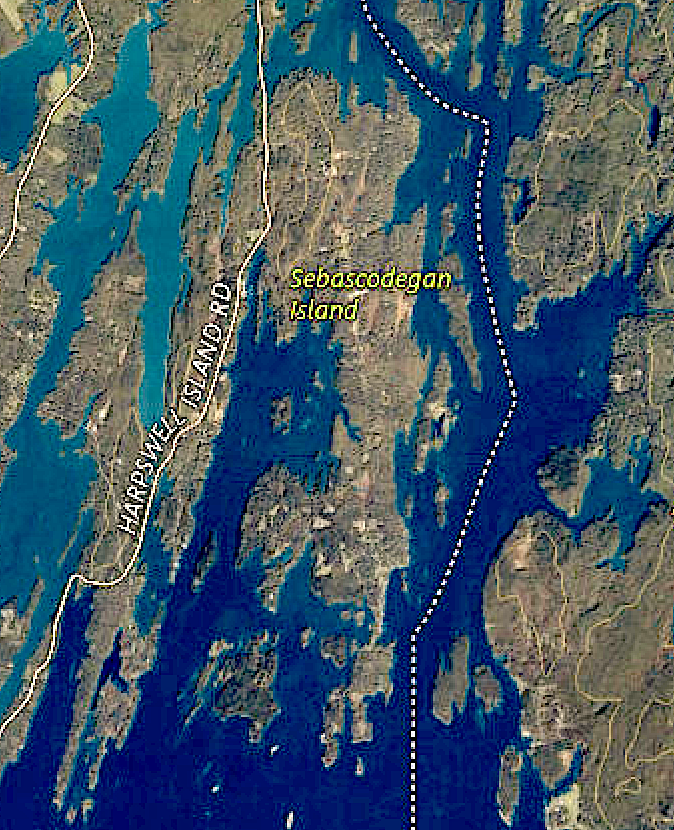
A U.S. Geological Survey topographic map of Sebascodegan Island in Harpswell, Maine.

At some point in the 18th century, a sailor's inn was created at Cundy's Harbor and run by Susan Eastman after the 1756 death of her husband David. Susan Eastman was accused of spying for the British during the American Revolution, but was acquitted.

Built in 1862, the historic Union Hotel at Cundy's Harbor is thought to be the oldest surviving coastal resort structure in Maine. The property became a private residence in the 1940s, and is operated today as a bed-and-breakfast lodging.

Casco Bay's Quahog Bay creates a major inlet of Sebascodegan Island, with the western side of the horseshoe-shaped island nearly divided in two by Long Reach and Quahog Bay's Card Cove.

At 201 feet, a Sebascodegan Island hill called Long Reach Mountain has the highest elevation of any Casco Bay island.

Sebascodegan Island is connected to Harpswell Neck by the 675-foot Ewing Narrows Bridge, which averages about 2,350 vehicles a day; and to Brunswick by the Gurnet Bridge, which averages nearly 6,800 vehicles daily. The Orr's Island Bridge averages nearly 3,100 vehicles heading to and from Orr's and Bailey islands, which are connected by the Bailey Island Bridge.

Natural conservation areas on Sebascodegan Island include the 200-acre (81 ha) Austin Cary Forest, named for forester Austin Cary; the 95-acre Long Reach Preserve; the 57-acre Anna M. Tondreau Preserve; and the 22-acre Little Ponds Preserve.

The Town of Harpswell lists Sebascodegan Island public boat launch sites at Bethel Point and Holbrook Street Landing in Cundy's Harbor, and marina and boatyard services at Cundy's Harbor and Orr's Cove in Quahog Bay.
