= Bailey Island Bridge =

Historic place in Maine

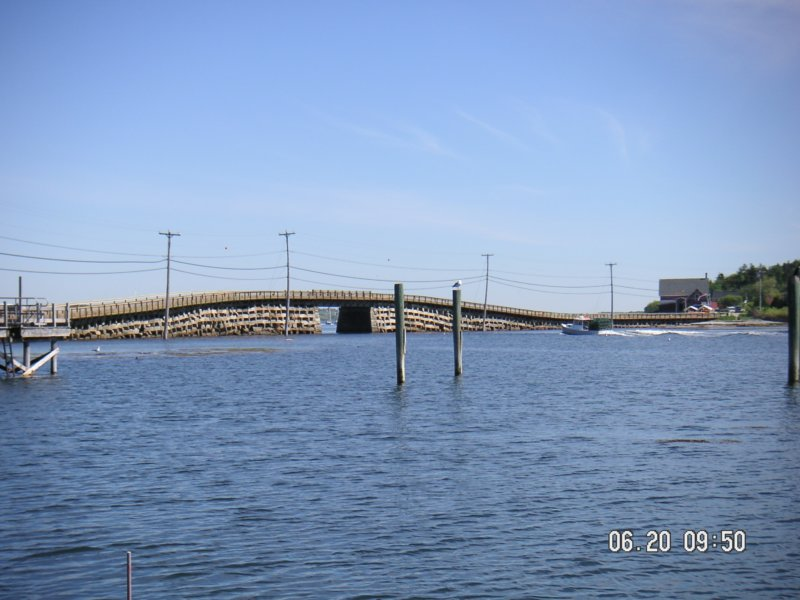
- Bailey Island Bridge from Bailey Island, looking toward Orr's Island
- Coordinates: 43°44′57.95″N 069°59′18.60″W
- Carries: Route 24
- Crosses: Will's Gut
- Locale: Harpswell, ME
- Owner: Maine Department of Transportation
- Maintained by: Maine Department of Transportation
- ID number: 02033

Characteristics
- Design: Concrete Tee Beam
- Total length: 355.7 metres (1,167 ft)
- Width: 8.5 metres (28 ft)
- Longest span: 15.9 metres (52 ft)

History
- Opened: 1926
- Rebuilt: 2010

Statistics
- Daily traffic: 2038
- Bailey Island Cobwork Bridge
- U.S. National Register of Historic Places
- Nearest city: Harpswell, ME
- NRHP reference No.: 75000093
- Added to NRHP: April 28, 1975

Location
- Interactive map of Bailey Island Bridge

The Bailey Island Bridge (also called the Cribstone Bridge) is a historic bridge in the town of Harpswell within Cumberland County in the state of Maine.

== History ==
For many years, the residents of Bailey Island, Maine, advocated that a bridge be built to connect their island with Orr's Island. The town of Harpswell, Maine, which encompasses both islands, turned down the request. However, when the Maine Legislature drafted a law allowing the state and counties to fund bridge construction, a plan emerged to build such a bridge. A contract was signed in 1926, with construction beginning on the Bailey Island Bridge in 1927 and finishing in 1928. The engineer for the project was Llewelyn N. Edwards, bridge engineer for the Maine State Highway Commission.

== Design ==
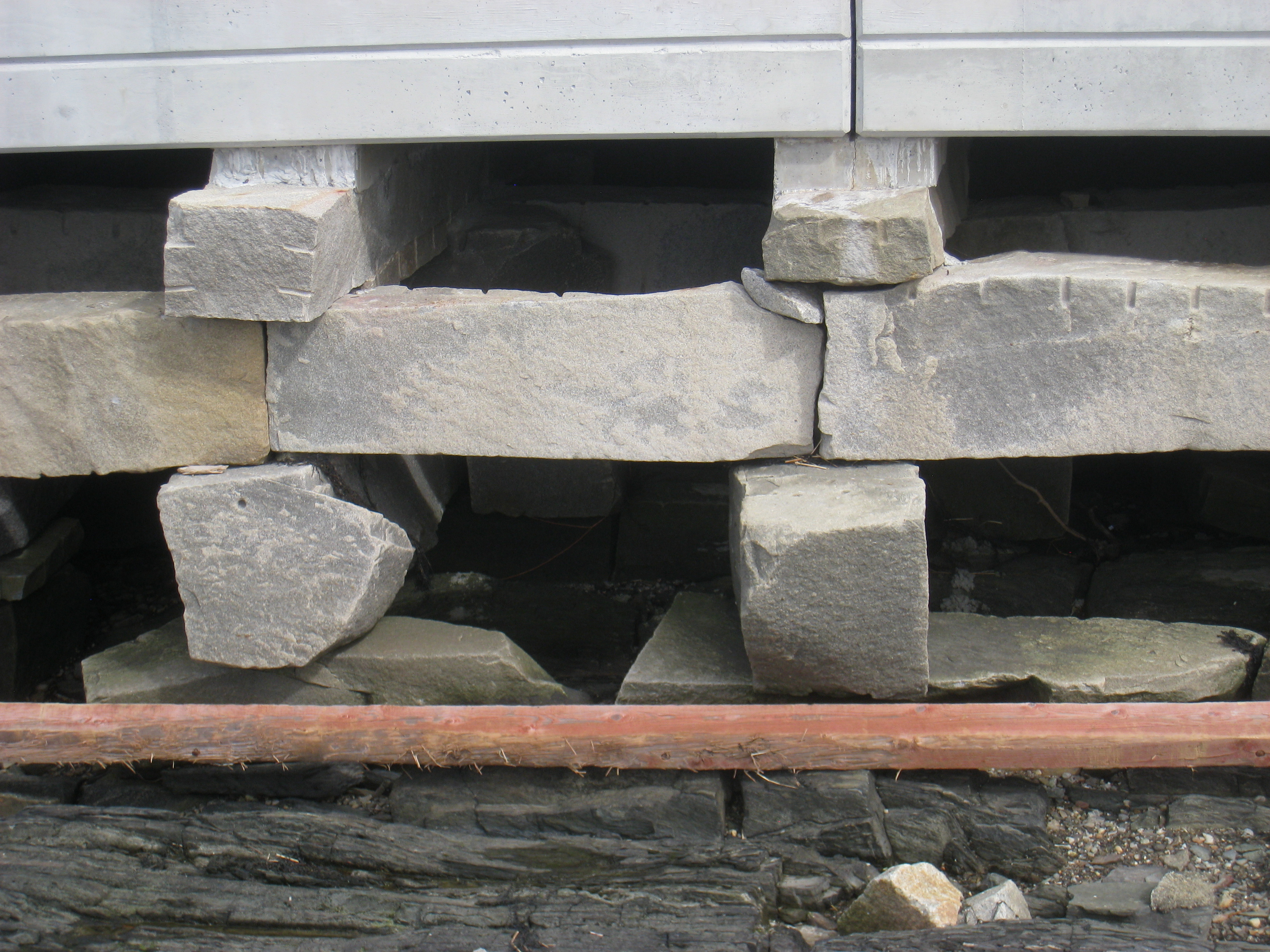
Cribstones used in the cobwork construction of the bridge

Design of the 1,150-foot-long (350 m) bridge was complicated by the tides in the area known as Will's Gut. It was decided to build a cobwork bridge, using granite slabs as cribstones, acquired from local quarries in nearby Yarmouth, Maine. The slabs allowed the tide to ebb and flow freely without increasing tidal current to any great degree.

Some 10,000 tons of granite were used in the project. A concrete road (now part of Route 24) was built on top of the cribstones.

== Additions and recognition ==
A sidewalk was added in 1951 and guard rails in 1961. The Bailey Island Bridge was listed on the National Register of Historic Places in 1975; on July 19, 1984, it was recognized as a National Historic Civil Engineering Landmark. The Bailey Island Bridge is reported to be the only granite cribstone bridge in the world.

In 2009 and 2010, the bridge underwent reconstruction to repair cracked or sheared stones. During the repairs, a 1,000-foot-long (300 m) temporary bridge was placed alongside the cribstone bridge so that traffic could continue without disruption. On November 20, 2010, a ribbon-cutting ceremony and parade took place to celebrate the reopening of the bridge. The restored bridge maintains the dimensions of the original, and the replacement stones were obtained from the same quarry in Yarmouth that supplied the original.

== Photo gallery ==
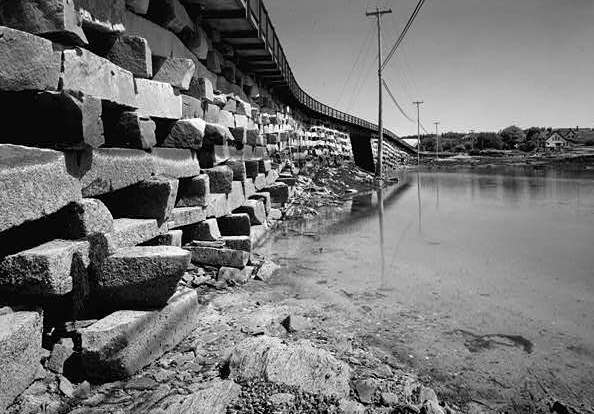
Stone cribs along the side of the bridge;

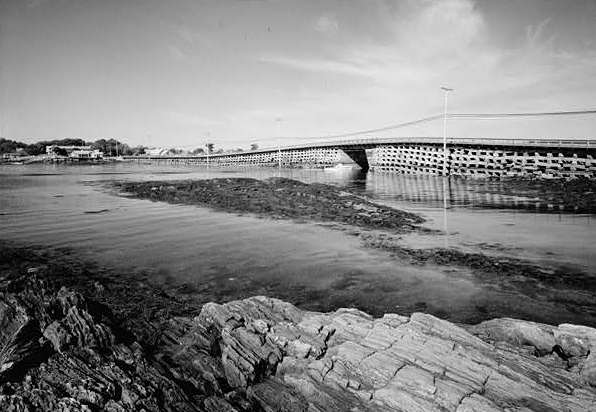
View of the bridge from the rocky shoreline;

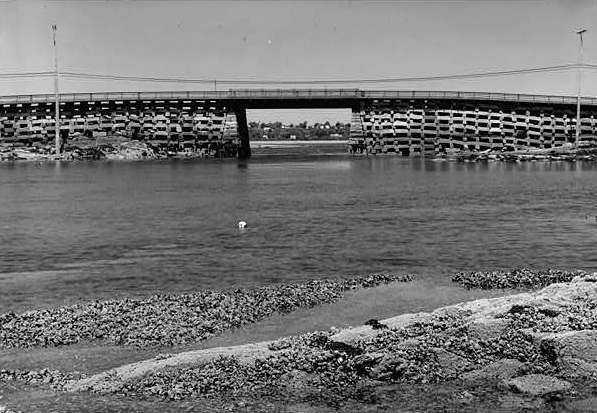
Close up of the water passage;

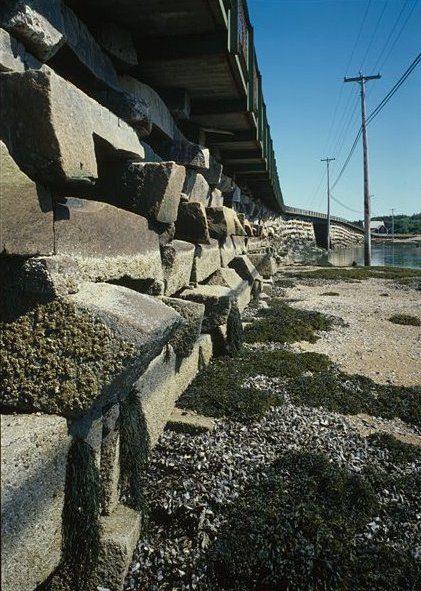
Close up: the stone base in color;

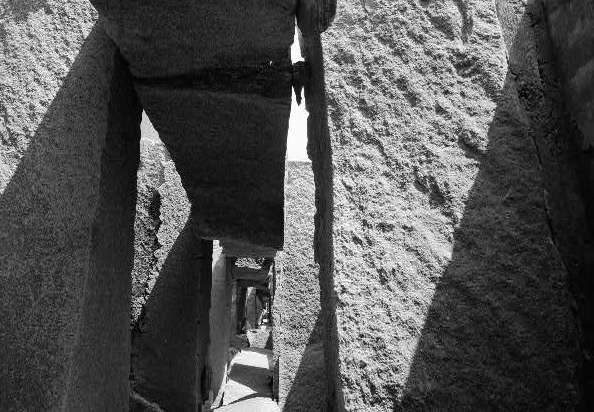
Stone piles under the bridge;

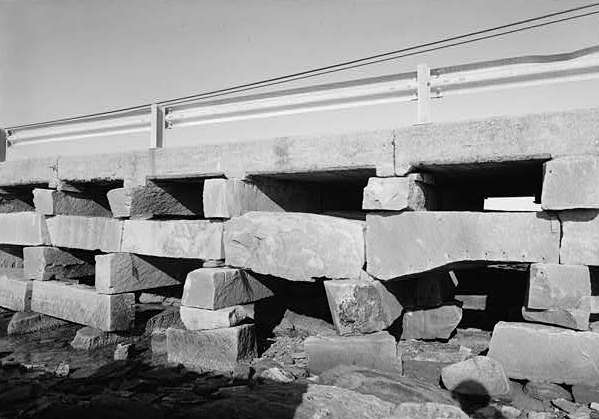
View of crib work and guard rails.

== See also ==
- List of bridges documented by the Historic American Engineering Record in Maine
- List of bridges on the National Register of Historic Places in Maine
- National Register of Historic Places listings in Cumberland County, Maine
