= Norumbega fault =

The Norumbega fault or the Norumbega fault system is a 20 to 25km wide fault and shear zone of the late Paleozoic era. It developed just inland from the Maine coast, with the geologic fault running roughly parallel to the coastline, including a portion of the northern shore of Casco Bay. The Flying Point Fault in Casco Bay is considered part of the Norumbega Fault system, dividing bedrock formations that have distinct geological characteristics.
