= Stedman–Thomas Historic District =

Historic district in Alaska, United States

- U.S. National Register of Historic Places
- U.S. Historic district
- Alaska Heritage Resources Survey
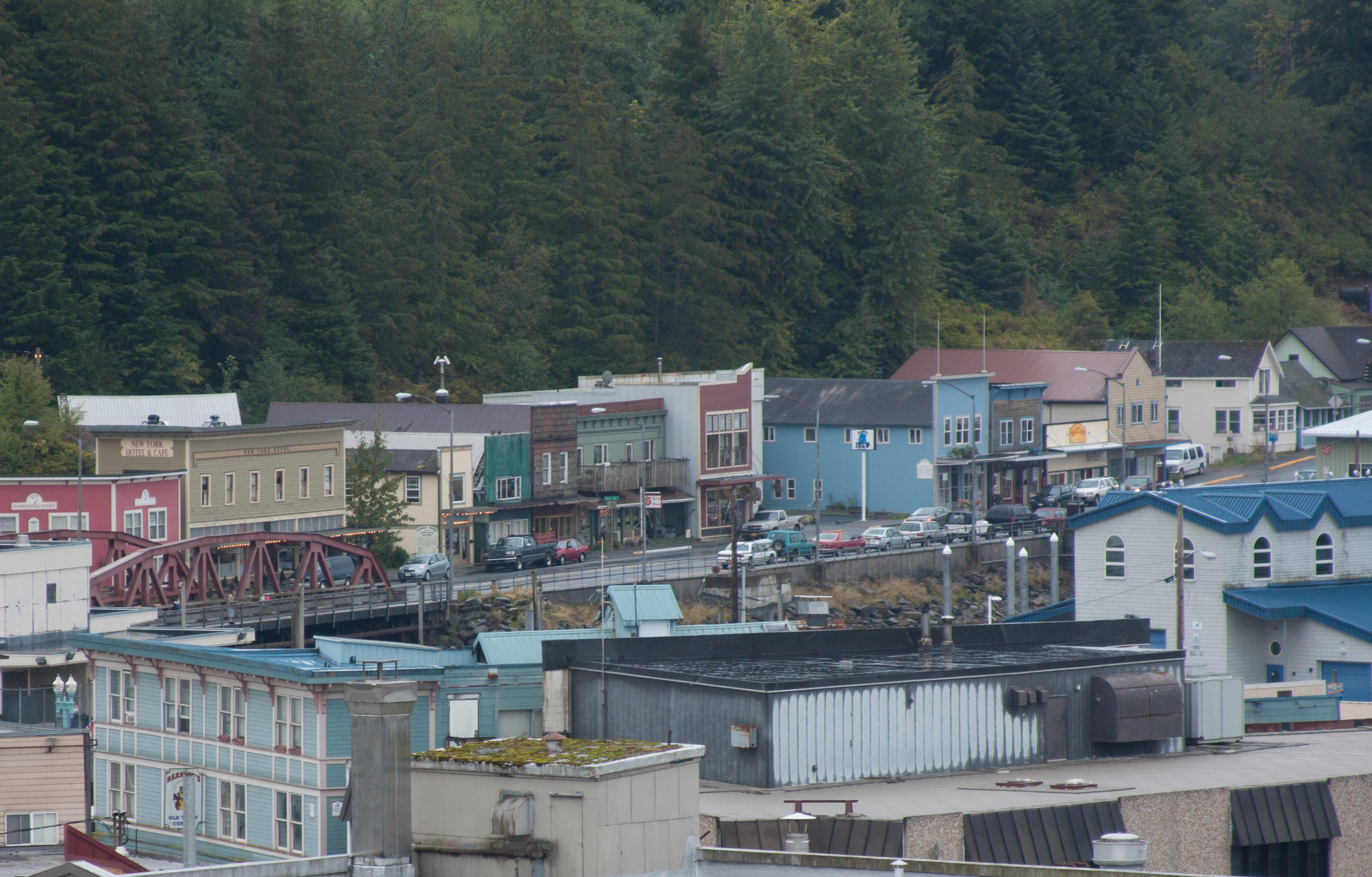
- Overhead view of Stedman Street and the historic district taken from a cruise ship in August 2010

- Location within Alaska
- Location: Stedman Street, Thomas Street, Inman Street, Brown Way, and Tatsuda Street, Ketchikan, Alaska
- Coordinates: 55°20′26″N 131°38′25″W
- Area: 5 acres (2.0 ha)
- NRHP reference No.: 96000062
- AHRS No.: KET-341
- Added to NRHP: February 21, 1996

The Stedman–Thomas Historic District encompasses what was historically the southern portion of Ketchikan, Alaska. It extends along Stedman and Thomas Streets, from Ketchikan Creek in the north to East Street in the south, and includes a few properties on adjacent spur side streets. In the early days of the city, the area was a seasonal Native fishing camp just south of the creek, but the Alaskan gold rushes around the turn of the 20th century brought an influx of settlers to the area.

Foreign workers and Natives generally lived south of the creek, and the area became known as Indian Town. As the town expanded in this area, commercial and residential buildings were built on pilings, something that only gradually began to change when fill was brought into Stedman Street in the 1930s. Most of the buildings on this stretch of Stedman Street were built between about 1900 and 1930, and are vernacular wood-frame structures. The commercial buildings facing Stedman Street generally have false fronts, which hide their gable roofs. The district include's Ketchikan's oldest continuously operating retail establishment, Ohashi's, which is located at 223 Stedman Street.

The district was listed on the National Register of Historic Places in 1996.

== Contributing properties ==
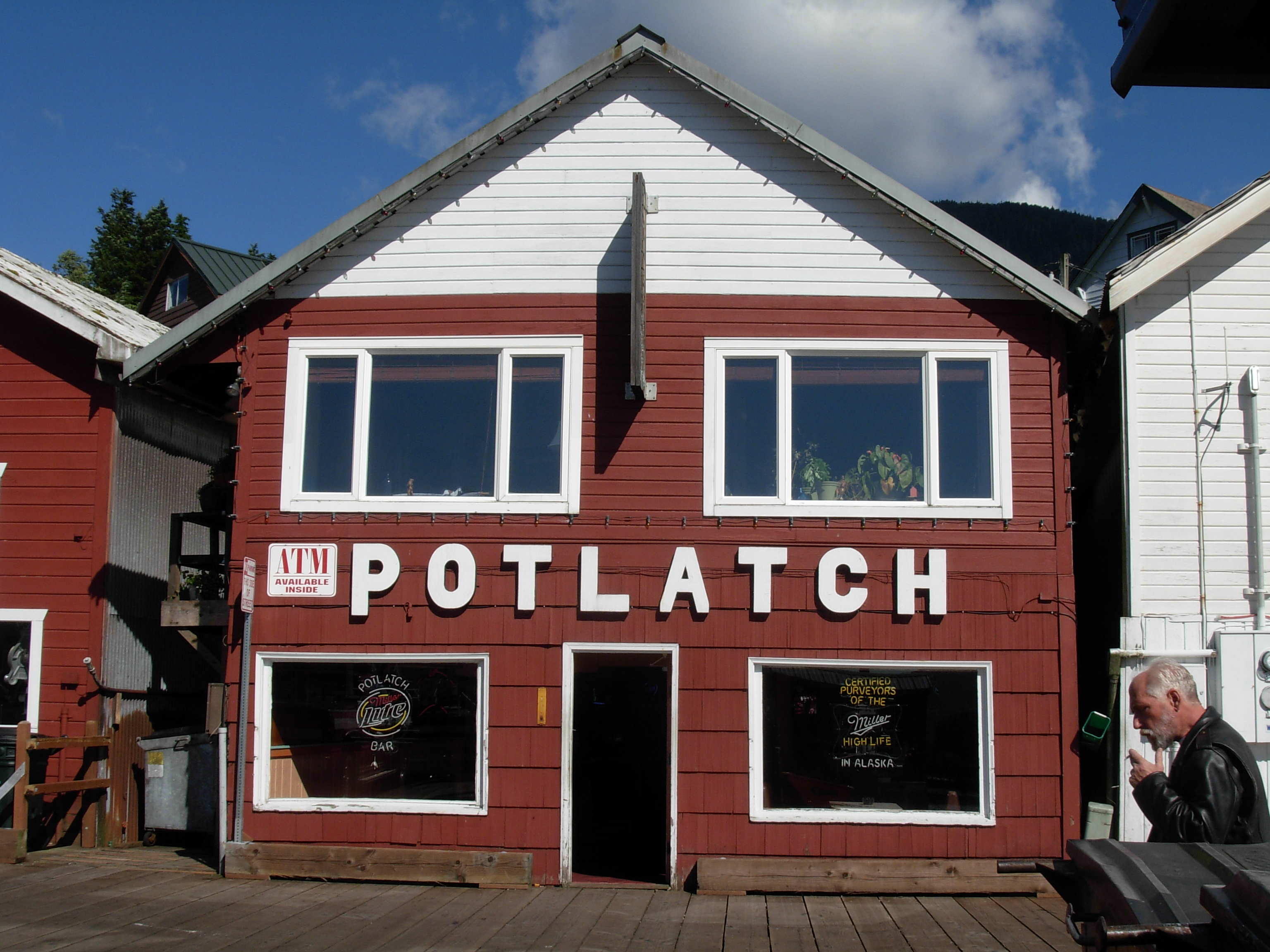
The Potlatch Tavern

The historical district contains a total of 34 contributing and 13 non-contributing properties. The most representative, built between 1904 and 1936 are:

- The New York Hotel and Cafe, 211 Stedman Street, 55°20′28″N 131°38′27″W (AHRS# KET-113) built 1924.
- The Ohashi Store, 223 Stedman Street, 55°20′27″N 131°38′25″W (AHRS# KET-120) built c. 1908.
- The Hiatt-Pool Hall, also known as Southeast Communications, 325/329 Stedman Street, 55°20′26″N 131°38′23″W (AHRS# KET-328) built c. 1920.
- The Thomas Street Viaduct, 55°20′23″N 131°38′23″W (AHRS# KET-089) built c. 1920.
- The Jacobsen's Storage, 121 Thomas Street, 55°20′22″N 131°38′22″W (AHRS# KET-188) built c. 1927.
- The Potlatch Bar, 126 Thomas Street, 55°20′22″N 131°38′22″W (AHRS# KET-185) built c. 1925.
- The Union Machine Shop, 130 Thomas Street, 55°20′23″N 131°38′22″W (AHRS# KET-184) built 1936.
- The Williams' House, 507 Stedman Street, 55°20′24″N 131°38′18″W (AHRS# KET-127) built c. 1910.
- The house at 108 Inman Street, 55°20′22″N 131°38′21″W (AHRS# KET-339) built c. 1910.
- The house at 114 Inman Street, 55°20′23″N 131°38′20″W (AHRS# KET-414) built c. 1904.
- The house at 237 Brown Way, 55°20′29″N 131°38′25″W (AHRS# KET-324) built c. 1928.

== See also ==
- National Register of Historic Places listings in Ketchikan Gateway Borough, Alaska
