= Downtown Ketchikan Historic District =

Historic district in Ketchikan, Alaska

Coordinates: 55.3383°N 131.6345°W

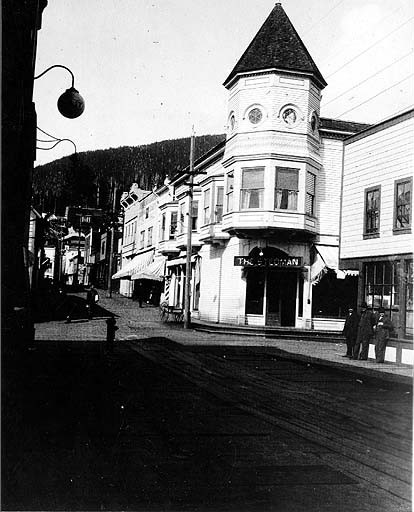
Hotel Stedman on Front Street, September 19, 1908

The Downtown Ketchikan Historic District in Ketchikan, Alaska, was listed on the National Register of Historic Places in 2017.

The listing was put out for comments in the Federal Register in 2016.

== See also ==
- Creek Street (Ketchikan, Alaska)
- National Register of Historic Places listings in Ketchikan Gateway Borough, Alaska
- Totem Heritage Center
