= Ketchikan Ranger House =

Historic house in Alaska, United States

- U.S. National Register of Historic Places
- Alaska Heritage Resources Survey
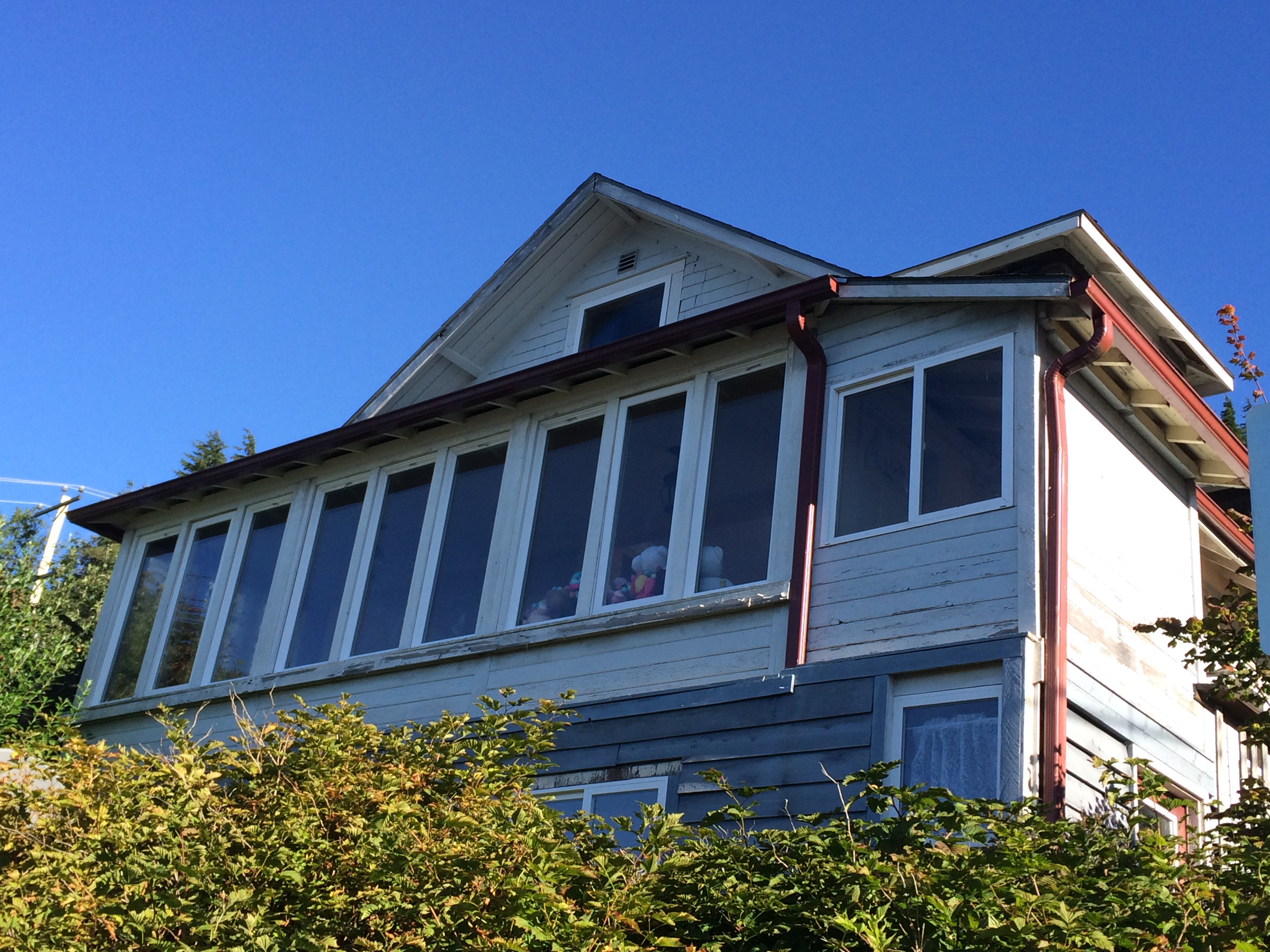

- Location within Alaska
- Location: 309 Gorge Street, Ketchikan, Alaska
- Coordinates: 55°20′47″N 131°39′34″W
- Area: 0.15 acres (0.061 ha)
- Built: 1916
- Architect: USDA Forest Service
- Architectural style: Vernacular Victorian
- NRHP reference No.: 87000645
- AHRS No.: KET-275

Significant dates
- Added to NRHP: July 16, 1987
- Designated AHRS: February 17, 1987

The Ketchikan Ranger House at 309 Gorge Street in Ketchikan, Alaska, was built in 1916 in the residential Captain's Hill district of Ketchikan. Designed by USDA Forest Service in "Vernacular Victorian" style, it housed the U.S. Forest Service's district rangers until 1978. The 1 1/2-story frame house has remained essentially unaltered from its original construction. It was built for $650 to serve the first forest ranger for the state of Alaska.

The house was originally built on a post-and-piling foundation, with a partial concrete foundation added at a later date when a basement was excavated. The gable roof runs from the front to the back, with two hipped dormers on the east side and one shed dormer on the west side. The front door is on the uphill side, offset to one side on a partly enclosed porch. Most of the house's original woodwork, finishes and hardware have survived.

The Ketchikan Ranger House was listed on the National Register of Historic Places in 1987.

== See also ==
- National Register of Historic Places listings in Ketchikan Gateway Borough, Alaska
