= Nathan Jackson =

American artist (born 1938)

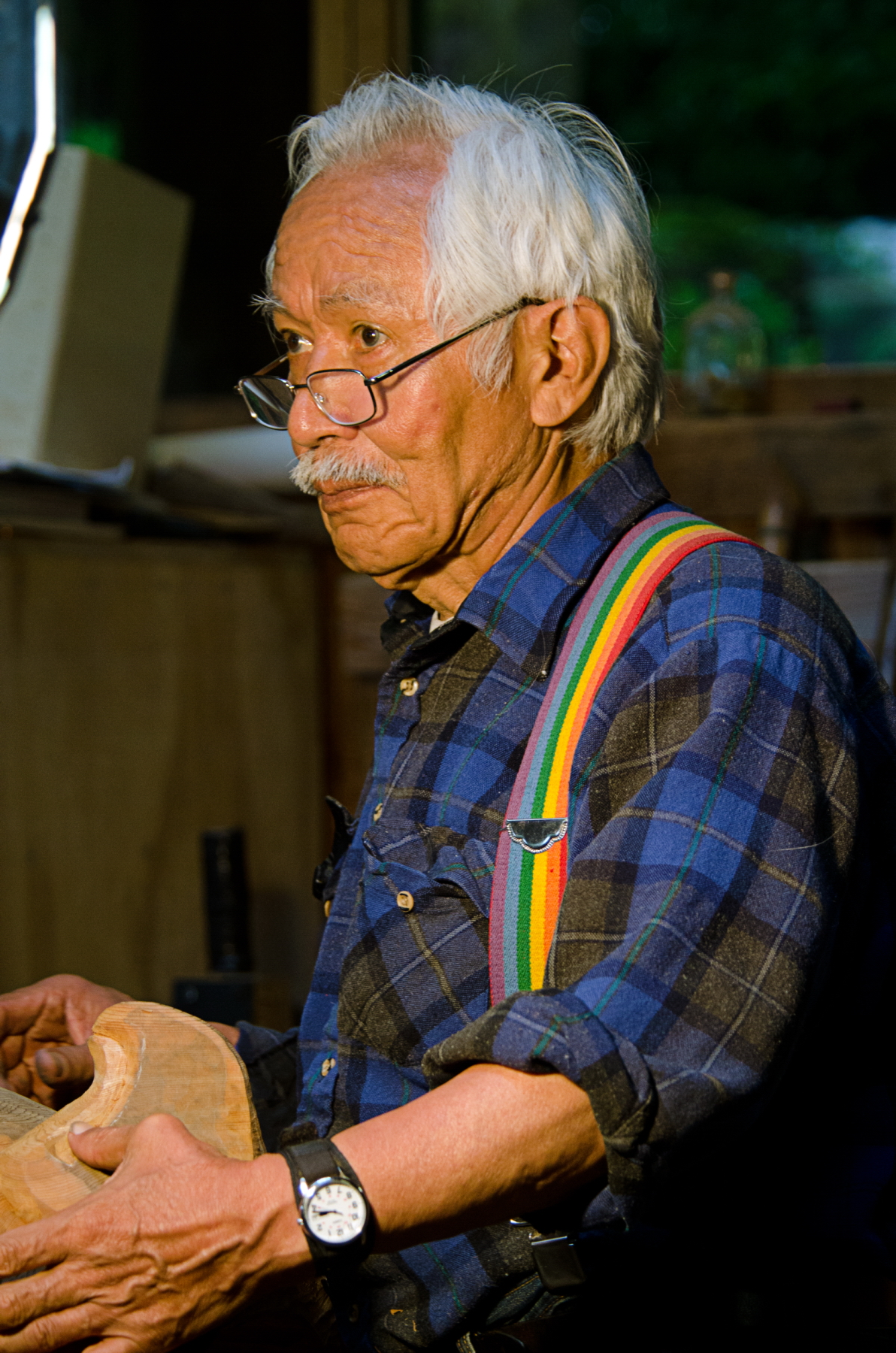
Jackson at work in his studio in August 2012.

Nathan Jackson (Tlingit: Yéil Yádi, lit. 'Raven Child', born August 29, 1938) is an Alaska Native artist. He is among the most important living Tlingit artists and the most important Alaskan artists. He is best known for his totem poles, but works in a variety of media.

Jackson belongs to the Sockeye clan on the Raven side of the Chilkoot Tlingit. As a young adult, he served in the military in Germany, and then became involved in commercial fishing. While ill with pneumonia and unable to fish, he began to carve miniature totem poles. His interest in art was piqued, and he enrolled in the Institute of American Indian Arts in Santa Fe, New Mexico. Since then, Jackson's work has included large totem poles, canoes, carved doors, wood panel clan crests, masks, and jewelry. Jackson has worked to pass on traditional Tlingit carving skills to younger artists, and has offered many demonstrations and workshops in Alaska and the Pacific Northwest.

Jackson has created more than 50 totem poles, some of which are on display in the National Museum of the American Indian, the Field Museum in Chicago, Harvard University's Peabody Museum, and other museums in the United States, Europe, and Japan. Other totem poles stand outside Juneau-Douglas High School, in Juneau's Sealaska Building, in Totem Bight State Historical Park, at the Alaska Native Heritage Center, at Saxman Totem Park, and at the Totem Heritage Center in Ketchikan. One of the earliest examples of his totem poles was carved for the American Festival held at the Horniman Museum, London in 1985 and now stands in a commanding position in the Horniman Gardens. In 1980, for the Juneau centennial, he was commissioned to carve the Wooshkeetaan Kootéeyaa and Áakʼw Kootéeyaa.

== Awards and honors ==
He is a recipient of a 1995 National Heritage Fellowship from the National Endowment for the Arts, a Rasmuson Foundation Distinguished Artist Award (2009), and a United States Artists Fellow (2021). He received an honorary doctorate in humanities from the University of Alaska Southeast. In 2023, the Native American Art Studies Association awarded him a Lifetime Achievement Award.

He is shown on the 1996 Raven Dance US postage stamp.

In 2022, Sealaska Heritage Institute invited carvers to create kootéeyaa (totem poles) for the Totem Pole Trail in Juneau, Alaska. Jackson and his son, known as Jackson Polys, will carve two poles.

== Personal life ==
Jackson currently resides in Ketchikan, Alaska. His wife and son are also artists.
