= Gilmore Building =

- U.S. National Register of Historic Places
- Alaska Heritage Resources Survey
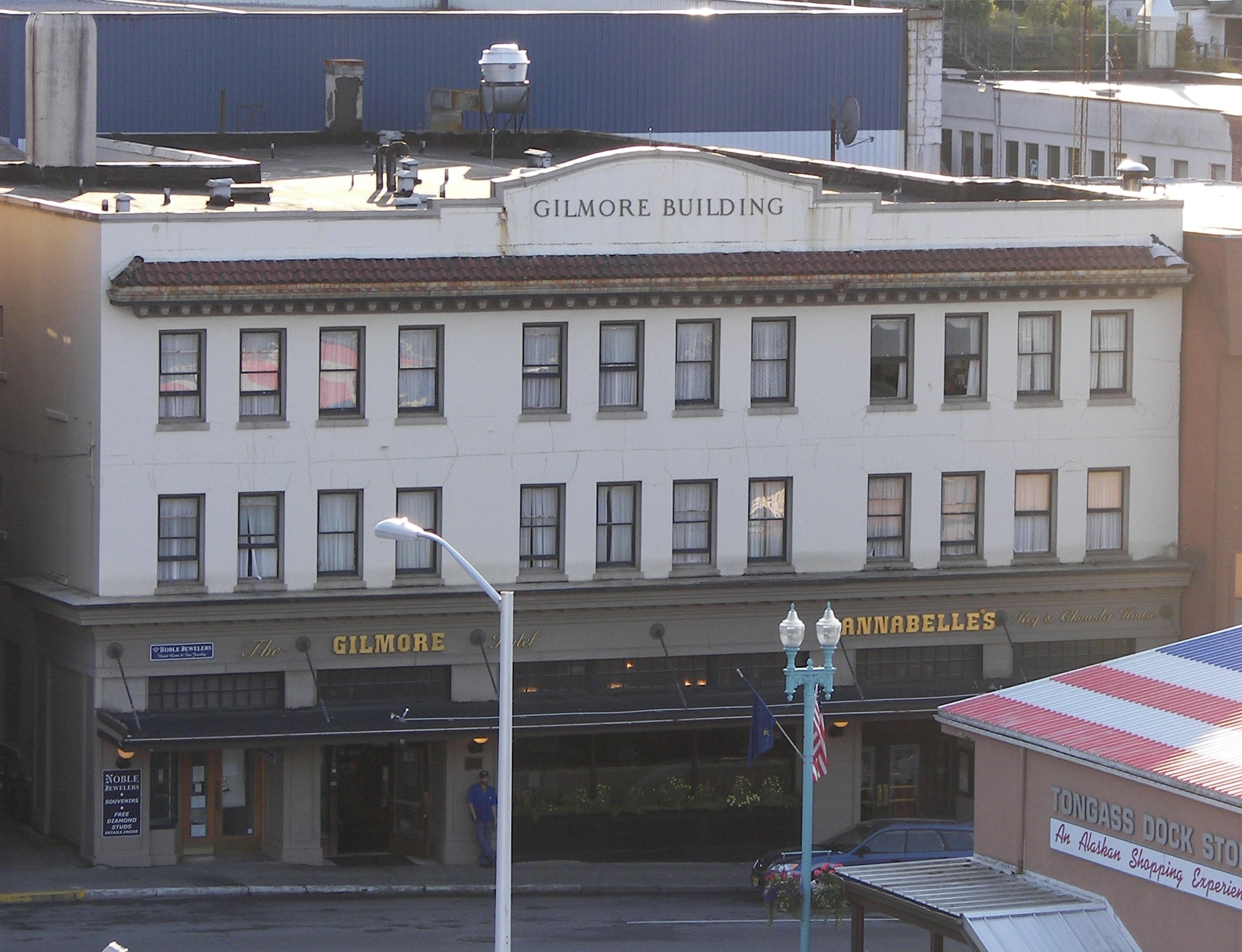

- Location within Alaska
- Location: 326 Front Street, Ketchikan, Alaska
- Coordinates: 55°20′32″N 131°38′52″W
- Area: less than one acre
- Built: 1927
- Built by: Hoard Engineering Company
- Architect: C. Frank Mahon
- NRHP reference No.: 89001415
- AHRS No.: KET-146
- Added to NRHP: September 27, 1989

The Gilmore Building, also known as the Gilmore Hotel, is a historic commercial building at 326 Front Street in Ketchikan, Alaska. It is a three-story masonry building located adjacent to Ketchikan City Hall, and was built in 1926–27 by P. J. Gilmore, Sr. to meet growing demand in the growing community for retail space and hotel rooms. The build is in the shape of a reversed L, whose base lies along Front Street, and includes three commercial storefronts. The upper floors are populated with hotel rooms.

The building was listed on the National Register of Historic Places in 1989. It is one of the only buildings in the city to survive from the 1920s.

== See also ==
- National Register of Historic Places listings in Ketchikan Gateway Borough, Alaska
