= Burkhart-Dibrell House =

Historic house in Alaska, United States

- U.S. National Register of Historic Places
- Alaska Heritage Resources Survey
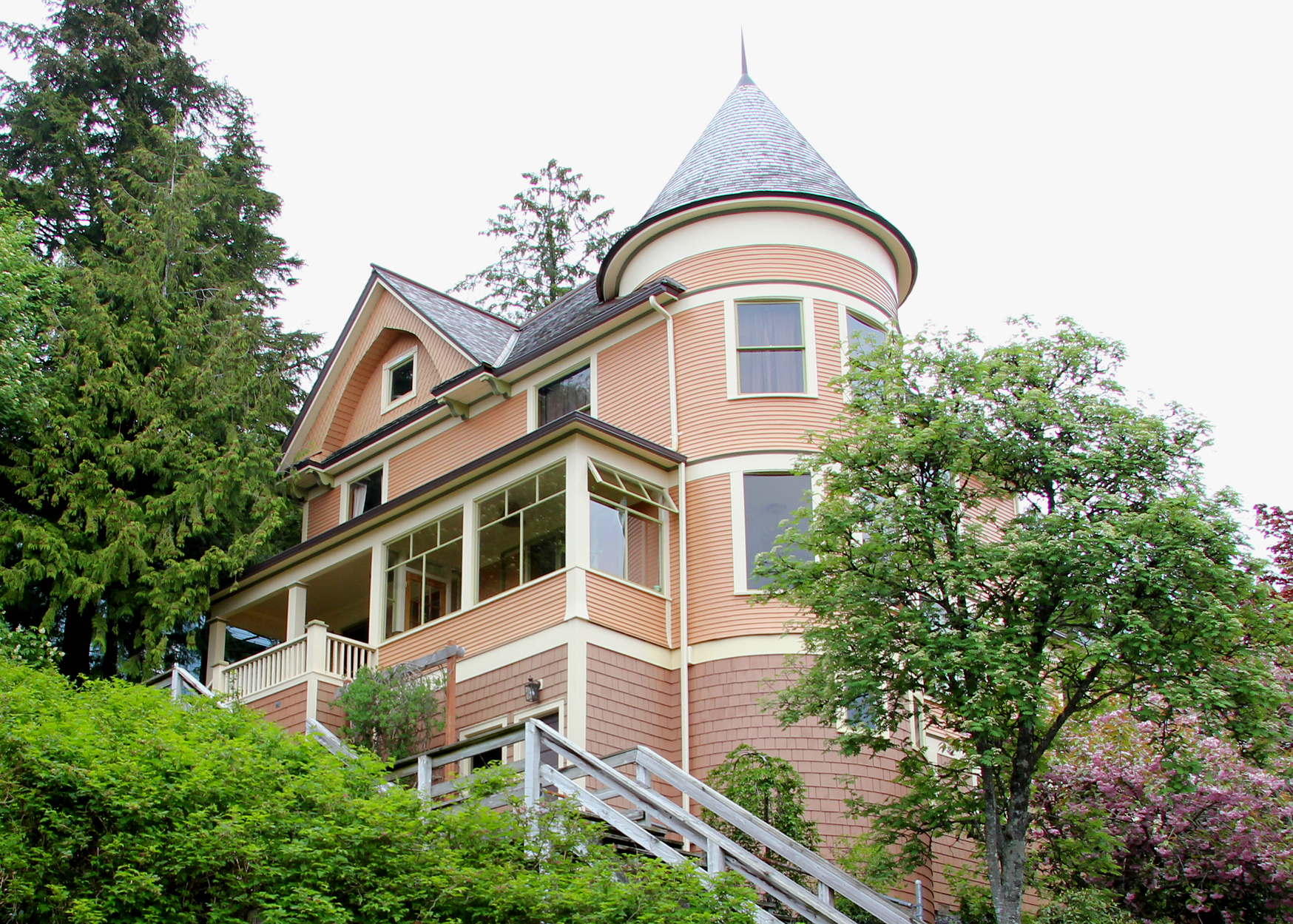

- Location within Alaska
- Location: 500 Main Street, Ketchikan, Alaska
- Coordinates: 55°20′38″N 131°38′54″W
- Area: less than one acre
- Built: 1904
- Built by: H.Z. Burkhart
- Architectural style: Queen Anne
- NRHP reference No.: 82004902
- AHRS No.: KET-111

Significant dates
- Added to NRHP: September 8, 1982
- Designated AHRS: June 30, 1980

The Burkhart-Dibrell House, also known as Monrean House, is a historic house at 500 Main Street in Ketchikan, Alaska. This three story wood-frame house was built in 1904 by H. Z. Burkart, the founder of Ketchikan Spruce Mills, and is the only significant surviving Queen Anne style house in Ketchikan. It occupies a prominent position at the head of Main Street, and has long been a local landmark. In 1916, the house was purchased by Captain Walter Dibrell, Superintendent of Lighthouses for all of Alaska. The house's most prominent feature is its turret with conical roof and gold spire.

The house was listed on the National Register of Historic Places in 1982.

== See also ==
- National Register of Historic Places listings in Ketchikan Gateway Borough, Alaska
