= National Register of Historic Places listings in Ketchikan Gateway Borough, Alaska =

Location of the Ketchikan Gateway Borough in Alaska

This is a list of the National Register of Historic Places listings in Ketchikan Gateway Borough, Alaska.

This is intended to be a complete list of the properties and districts on the National Register of Historic Places in Ketchikan Gateway Borough, Alaska, United States. The locations of National Register properties and districts for which the latitude and longitude coordinates are included below, may be seen in an online map.

There are 20 properties and districts listed on the National Register in the borough. Another two properties were once listed but have been removed.

This National Park Service list is complete through NPS recent listings posted August 7, 2026.

== Current listings ==
	Name on the Register	Image	Date listed	Location	City or town	Description
1	Alaska Totems	Alaska Totems	June 21, 1971 (#71001090)	Between Park Avenue and Deermount Avenue; 55°20′33″N 131°38′03″W	Ketchikan	Site of the Totem Heritage Center.
2	Burkhart-Dibrell House	Burkhart-Dibrell House	September 8, 1982 (#82004902)	500 Main Street; 55°20′38″N 131°38′54″W	Ketchikan	
3	Chief Kashakes House	Chief Kashakes House	April 26, 1993 (#93000338)	Mile 2.5 of South Tongass Highway; 55°19′05″N 131°35′49″W	Saxman	
4	Clover Pass School		August 22, 2005 (#05000898)	Potter Road off Knudson Cove Road; 55°28′22″N 131°47′32″W	Clover Pass	
5	Creek Street Historic District	Creek Street Historic District	August 6, 2014 (#14000454)	Creek Street, Married Man's Trail and Totem Way; 55°20′33″N 131°38′31″W	Ketchikan	
6	Downtown Ketchikan Historic District	Downtown Ketchikan Historic District	October 2, 2017 (#16000467)	Front, Main, Mission, Dock & Mill Sts. 55°20′30″N 131°38′45″W	Ketchikan	
7	First Lutheran Church	First Lutheran Church	May 18, 1987 (#87000716)	1200 Tongass Avenue; 55°20′43″N 131°39′28″W	Ketchikan	
8	Gilmore Building	Gilmore Building	September 27, 1989 (#89001415)	326 Front Street; 55°20′32″N 131°38′52″W	Ketchikan	
9	Guard Island Lighthouse	Guard Island Lighthouse	January 14, 2004 (#03001378)	On Guard Island, at the northern end of Tongass Narrows, about 9.6 miles (15.4 km) northwest of Ketchikan; 55°26′46″N 131°52′52″W	Ketchikan	
10	Ketchikan Federal Building	Ketchikan Federal Building	April 28, 2006 (#05000897)	648 Mission Street; 55°20′30″N 131°38′34″W	Ketchikan	
11	Ketchikan Ranger House	Ketchikan Ranger House	July 16, 1987 (#87000645)	309 Gorge Street; 55°20′47″N 131°39′34″W	Ketchikan	
12	Mary Island Light Station	Mary Island Light Station	July 8, 2005 (#05000645)	Northeastern end of Mary Island, between Revillagigedo Channel and Felice Strait, about 6.4 miles (10.3 km) south of Revillagigedo Island; 55°05′56″N 131°10′58″W	Ketchikan	
13	Saxman Totem Park	Saxman Totem Park	August 7, 1979 (#79003758)	2660 Killer Whale Avenue; 55°19′11″N 131°35′47″W	Saxman	
14	Stedman-Thomas Historic District	Stedman-Thomas Historic District	February 21, 1996 (#96000062)	Stedman Street, Thomas Street, Inman Street, Brown Way, and Tatsudu Street; 55°20′26″N 131°38′25″W	Ketchikan	
15	Storehouse No. 3	Storehouse No. 3	December 7, 1977 (#77001575)	About 61 miles (98 km) east of Ketchikan, at the mouth of Halibut Bay; 55°14′07″N 130°06′11″W	Ketchikan	
16	The Star	The Star	April 26, 1993 (#93000336)	5 Creek Street; 55°20′33″N 131°38′33″W	Ketchikan	Also a contributing property to Creek Street Historic District.
17	Totem Bight State Historic Site	Totem Bight State Historic Site	October 27, 1970 (#70000916)	Mile 10.5 of North Tongass Highway; 55°25′12″N 131°46′21″W	Ketchikan	
18	Tree Point Lighthouse	Tree Point Lighthouse	October 27, 2004 (#04001177)	Western coast of the mainland on eastern side of Revillagigedo Channel, about 47 miles (76 km) southeast of Ketchikan; 54°48′10″N 130°56′02″W	Ketchikan	
19	Walker-Broderick House	Walker-Broderick House	August 31, 1982 (#82004903)	541 Pine Street; 55°20′40″N 131°38′48″W	Ketchikan	
20	Ziegler House	Ziegler House	May 30, 1985 (#85001161)	623 Grant Street; 55°20′40″N 131°38′43″W	Ketchikan	

== Former listings ==
	Name on the Register	Image	Date listed	Date removed	Location	City or town	Description
1	Ayson Hotel		June 17, 1987 (#86003366)	June 4, 1990	301-305 Stedman Street	Ketchikan	Also known as the Dick Harris Marine Hardware. Demolished in May 1990
2	McKay Marine Ways		September 26, 1998 (#88001569)	January 18, 1990	1935 Tongass Avenue	Ketchikan	Building demolished in 1989.

== See also ==
- List of National Historic Landmarks in Alaska
- National Register of Historic Places listings in Alaska
