= Chief Kashakes House =

Historic house in Alaska, United States

- U.S. National Register of Historic Places
- Alaska Heritage Resources Survey
- HABS drawing of house

- Location within Alaska
- Location: Mile 2.5 of South Tongass Highway, Saxman, Alaska
- Coordinates: 55°19′5″N 131°35′49″W
- Area: less than one acre
- Built: 1895
- NRHP reference No.: 93000338
- AHRS No.: KET-343
- Added to NRHP: April 26, 1993

The Chief Kashakes House, also known as the Eagle Tail House and Chief Kah-Shakes House, is a historic Tlingit clan house in Saxman, Alaska. Built in 1895 using balloon framing, the two story wood-frame structure was the first structure built in Saxman, and is the only surviving clan house of its type there. It has a hip roof, and is clad in shiplap siding. The front originally had a porch extending across the full width, but this has been reduced to just the central portion. Three totem poles flank the building, two eagle-topped poles to the right and a beaver pole to the left. An old Russian cannon stands near the house.

The house was listed on the National Register of Historic Places in 1993.

== See also ==
- National Register of Historic Places listings in Ketchikan Gateway Borough, Alaska
