= Totem Bight State Historical Park =

State park in Alaska, United States

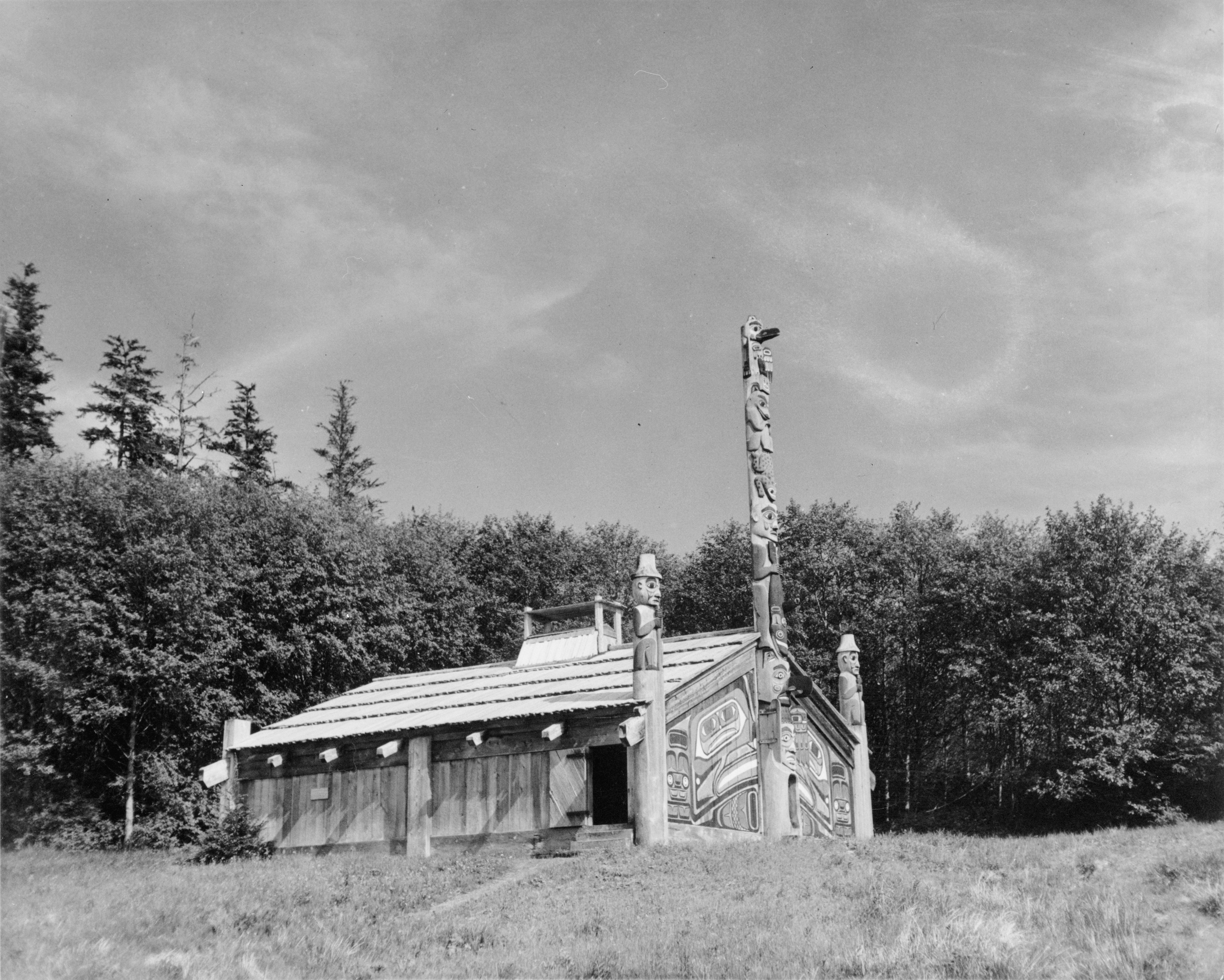
- Interactive map of Totem Bight State Historical Park
- Location: Mile 10.5 of the North Tongass Highway in Ketchikan Gateway Borough, Alaska, U.S.
- Area: 33 acres (13 ha)
- Created: 1959
- Operator: Alaska Department of Natural Resources
- Totem Bight State Historic Site
- U.S. National Register of Historic Places
- Alaska Heritage Resources Survey
- Location within Alaska
- Nearest city: Ketchikan, Alaska
- Coordinates: 55°25′12″N 131°46′21″W
- Area: 8.5 acres (3.4 ha)
- Built: 1940
- Architects: Brown, Charles; Et al.
- NRHP reference No.: 70000916
- AHRS No.: KET-014
- Added to NRHP: October 27, 1970

Totem Bight State Historical Park is a 33-acre (13 ha) state park in the U.S. state of Alaska. It is located north of Ketchikan.

== Description and history ==
Young conifers growing on a moss-covered nurse stump in the temperate rainforest at Totem Bight State Historical Park

The park is located on the former site of a traditional Native campground known as Mud Village and Mud Bight Village. It contains a collection of totem poles and a replica of a traditional chieftain's house. This wood-frame structure has a low oval entrance, leading into a square chamber with a central fire pit, decorated with carved "house posts". A stylized raven adorns the main facade. The carvings on the house were executed by Charles Brown, a Tlingit of Saxman.

The United States Forest Service used Civilian Conservation Corps (CCC) funds to hire skilled carvers from among the older Alaska Natives to repair or duplicate totem poles that were abandoned when the natives moved to communities where work was available. The CCC project built the community house and placed 15 totem poles, most of them replicas of 19th-century poles. At statehood in 1959, title to the land passed from the federal government to the State of Alaska.

The historic site, comprising 8.5 acres (3.4 ha) of the park, was added to the National Register of Historic Places on October 27, 1970.

== See also ==
- List of Alaska state parks
- National Register of Historic Places listings in Ketchikan Gateway Borough, Alaska
- Saxman Totem Park, in neighboring Saxman, Alaska
