= Totem Heritage Center =

Museum in Ketchikan, Alaska, US

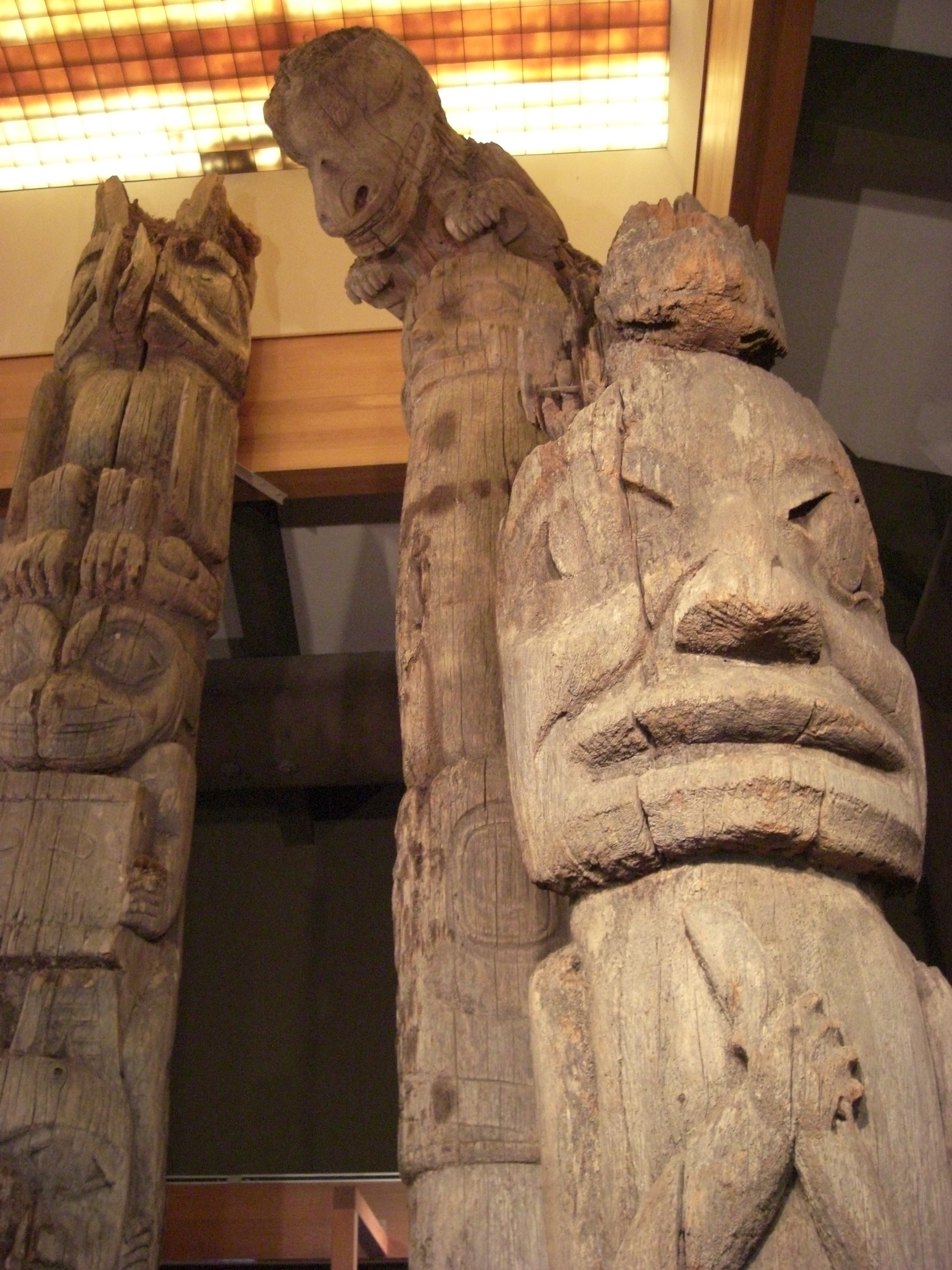
- Established: 1976
- Location: 601 Deermount Street, Ketchikan, Alaska
- Coordinates: 55°20′33″N 131°38′03″W
- Collection size: 33 totem poles
- Director: Anita Maxwell
- Website: www.ketchikanmuseums.org
- Alaska Totems
- U.S. National Register of Historic Places
- Alaska Heritage Resources Survey
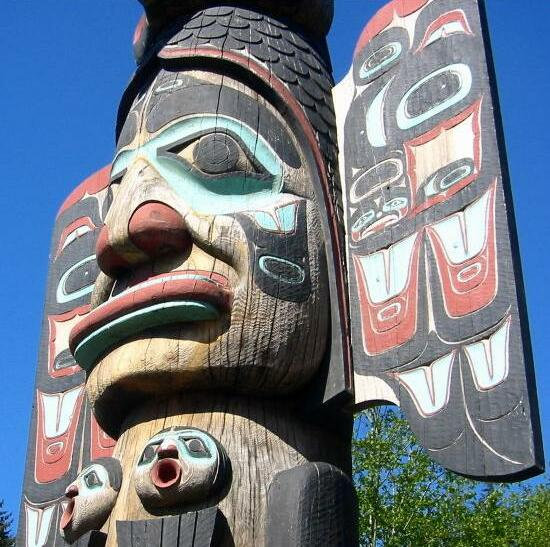

- Location within Alaska
- Location: Between Park Avenue and Deermount Avenue, Ketchikan, Alaska
- Area: 1.68 acres (0.68 ha)
- NRHP reference No.: 71001090
- AHRS No.: KET-001
- Added to NRHP: June 21, 1971

The Totem Heritage Center is a historical and cultural museum founded in 1976 and located in Ketchikan, Alaska. The center is operated by the city of Ketchikan.

The location of the Totem Heritage Center was listed on the National Register of Historic Places as Alaska Totems on June 21, 1971.

== History ==
The center was founded in 1976 to preserve these totems and act as a cultural center. Sixteen of the museum's thirty-three totem poles are on permanent display, although the rest of the collection is available for research purposes. The center also exhibits other Tlingit, Haida, and Tsimshian artifacts and art pieces, including work by world-famous Tlingit carver Nathan Jackson, and renowned Haida weaver Delores Churchill.

In November 1990, a Ravenstail Weaver's Guild was formed in Ketchikan through the Totem Heritage Center. The guild served to strengthen the almost extinct craft of Ravenstail weaving and the community of makers of both Native and non-Natives in the United States and Canada.

== About ==
The Heritage Center houses one of the world's largest collections of unrestored 19th century totem poles. The poles were recovered from uninhabited Tlingit settlements on Village Island and Tongass Island, south of Ketchikan, as well as from the Haida village of Old Kasaan.

In addition to functioning as a museum, the Totem Heritage Center preserves and promotes the traditional arts and crafts of the Tlingit, Haida, and Tsimshian peoples through a nationally recognized program of art classes and other activities. Classes are held throughout the year, and the museum is open to visitors year-round, with extended hours during the summer.

== See also ==
- National Register of Historic Places listings in Ketchikan Gateway Borough, Alaska
