= Ketchikan, Alaska =

City in Alaska, United States

Ketchikan Kichx̱áan
- City
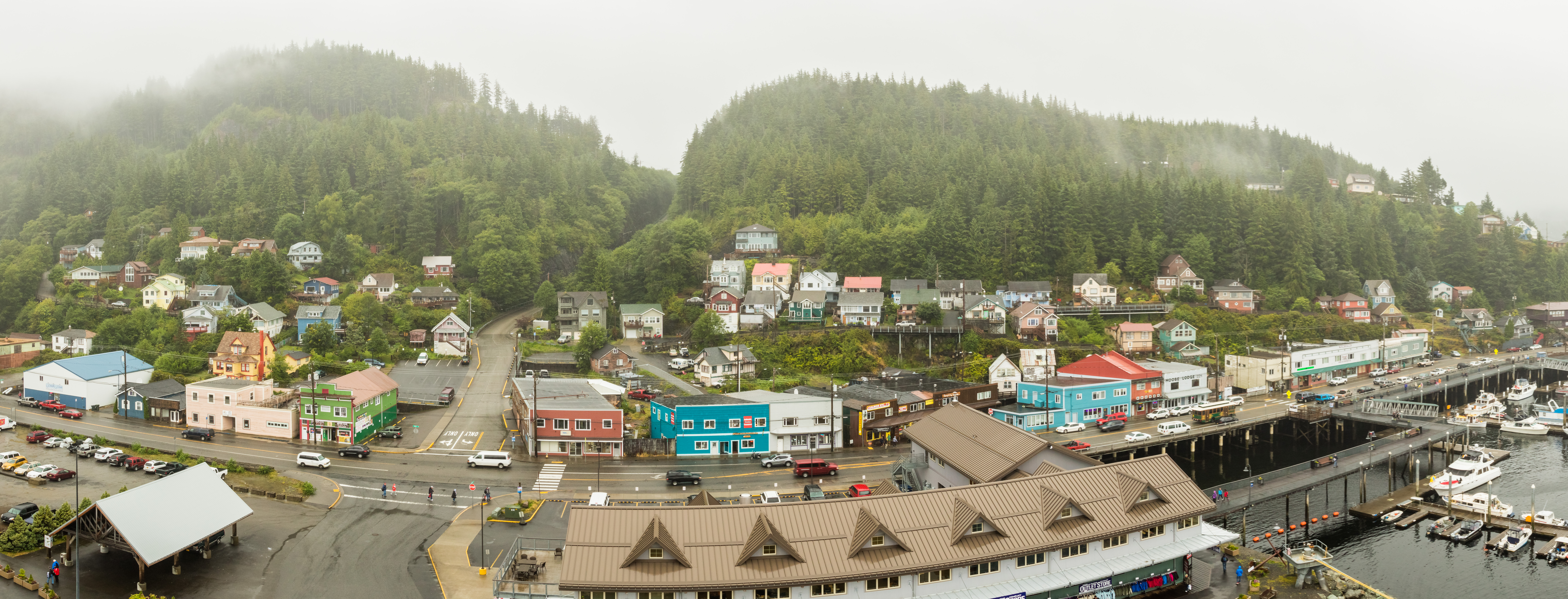
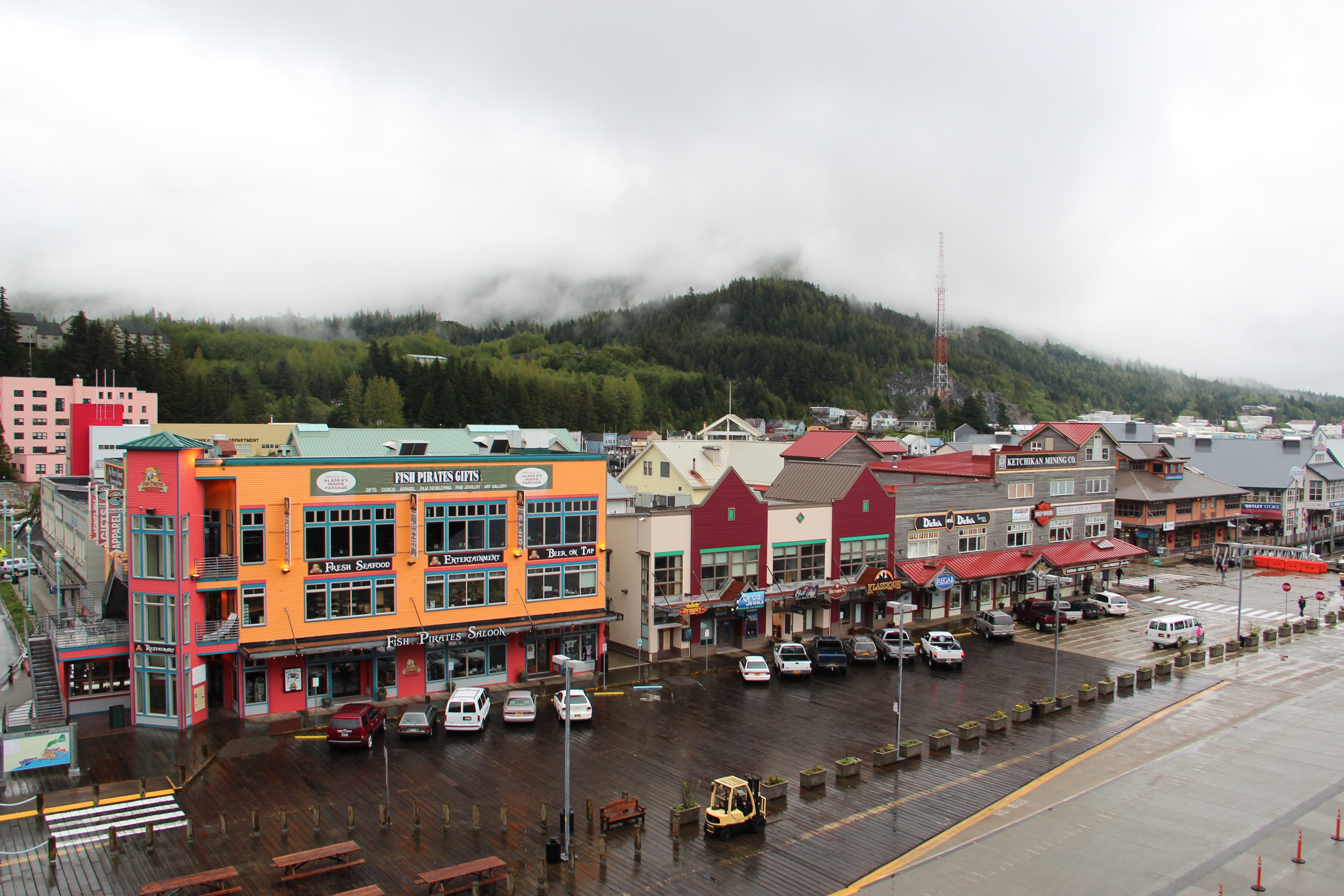
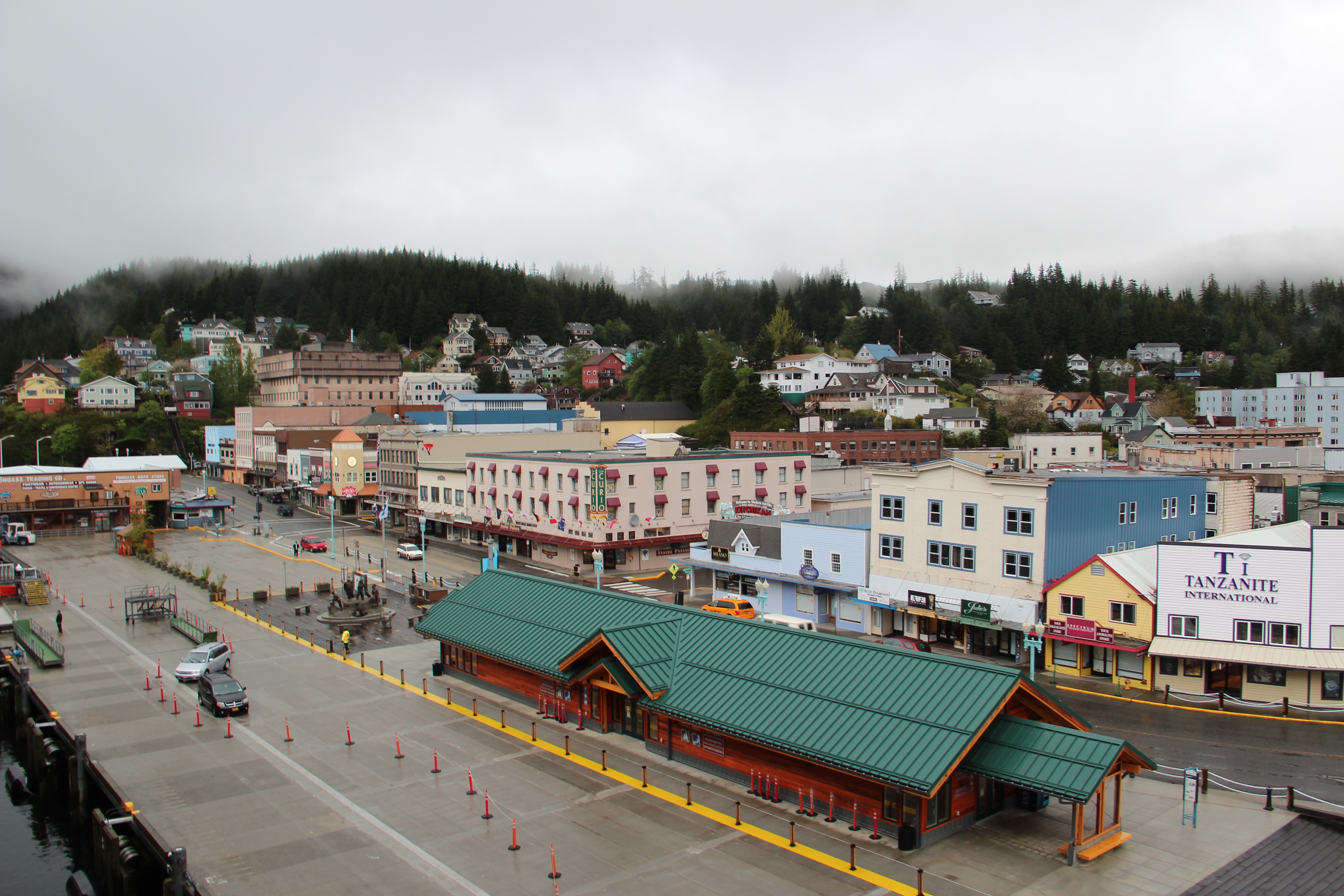
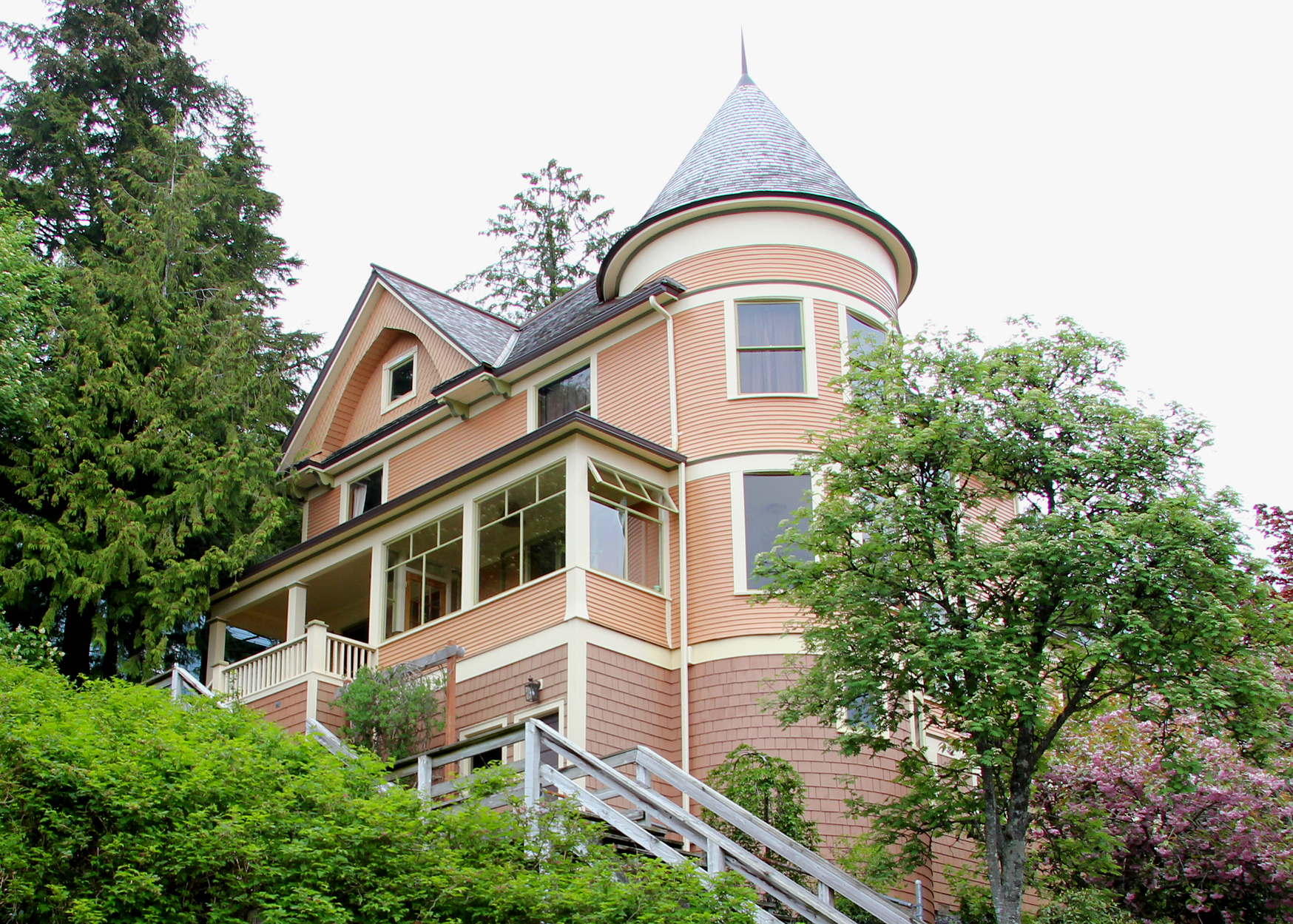
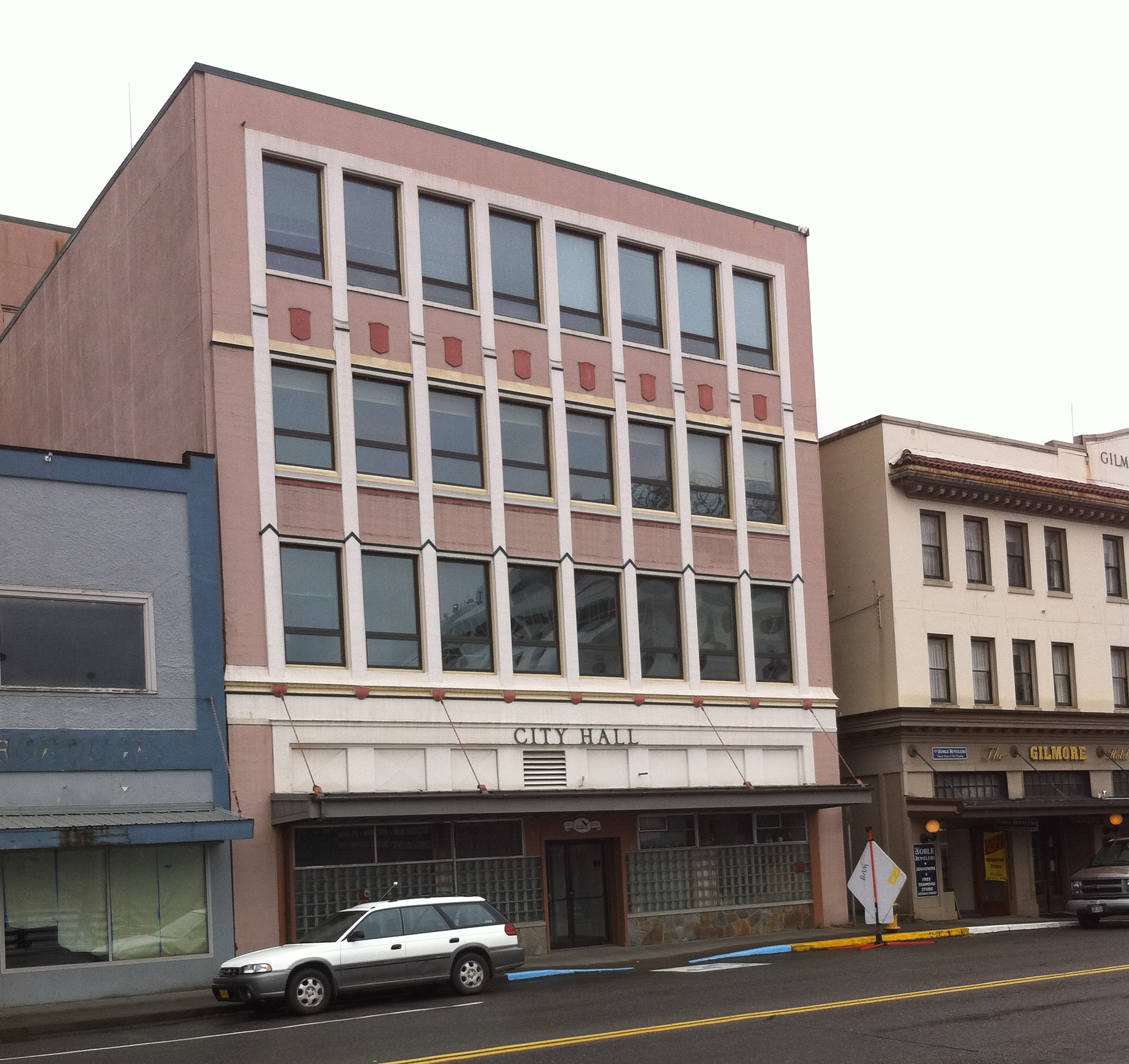
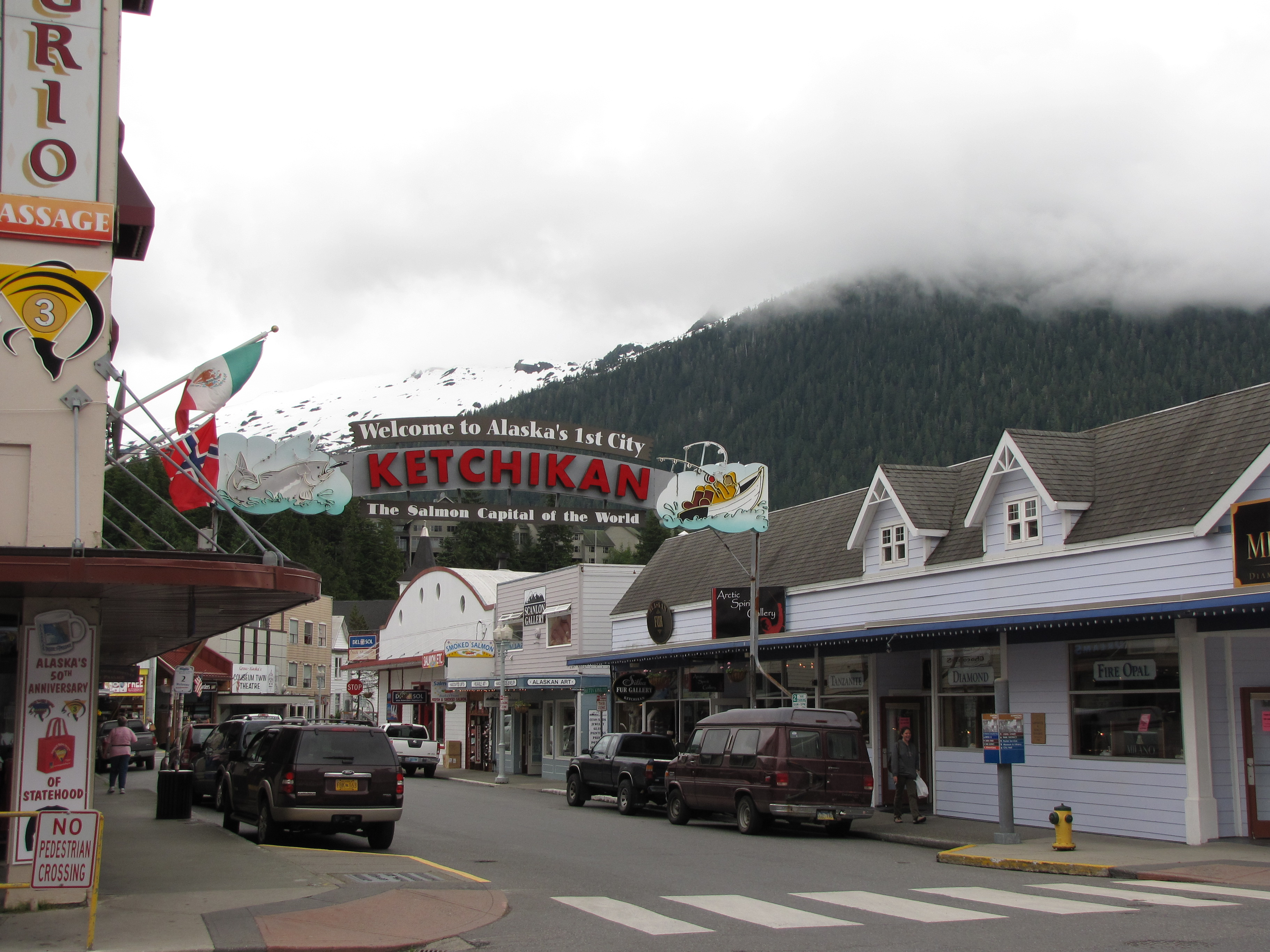
- View of the Newtown area Downtown in 2013 Front Street Burkhart-Dibrell House City Hall Sign over Mission Street

- Flag Logo
- Nicknames: Salmon Capital of the World, Rain Capital of Alaska, Alaska's First City
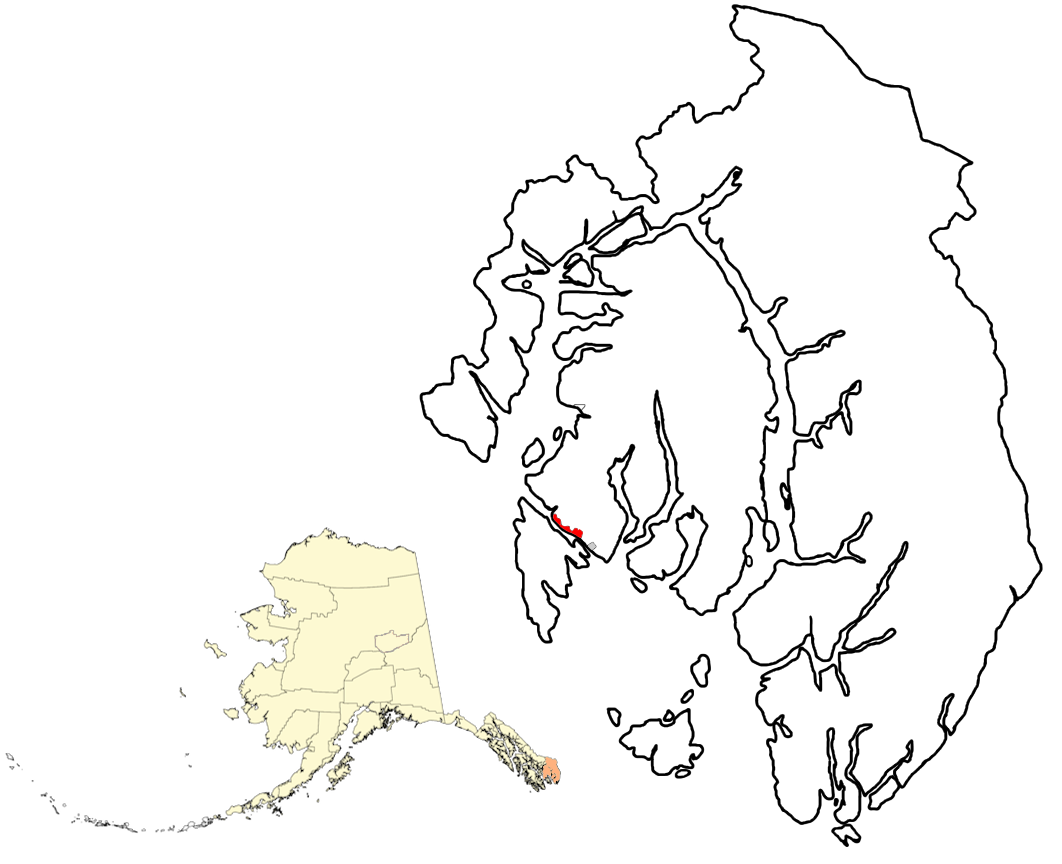
- Location in Ketchikan Gateway Borough, Alaska
- Country: United States
- State: Alaska
- Borough: Ketchikan Gateway
- Incorporated: August 25, 1900

Government
  - Mayor: Dave Kiffer
  - Governing body: City Council
  - State senator: Bert Stedman (R)
  - State rep. (1st District): Jeremy Bynum (R)

Area
  - Total: 4.90 sq mi (12.70 km^{2})
  - Land: 3.81 sq mi (9.88 km^{2})
  - Water: 1.09 sq mi (2.82 km^{2})
- Elevation: 0 ft (0 m)

Population (2020)
  - Total: 8,192
  - Density: 2,147.6/sq mi (829.19/km^{2})
  - City and Borough: 13,477
  - City and Borough Estimate (2014): 13,787
- Time zone: UTC−9 (AKST)
  - Summer (DST): UTC−8 (AKDT)
- ZIP codes: 99901, 99950
- Area code: 907
- FIPS code: 02-38970
- GNIS feature ID: 1423039, 2419408
- Website: www.ketchikan.gov

Ketchikan (/ˈkɛtʃɪkæn/ KETCH-ih-kan; Tlingit: Kichx̱áan, pronounced [kʰɪt͡ʃʰχáːn]) is a city in and the borough seat of the Ketchikan Gateway Borough on Revillagigedo Island of Alaska. It is the state's southeasternmost major settlement. Downtown Ketchikan is a National Historic Landmark District.

With a population at the 2020 census of 8,192, up from 8,050 in 2010, it is the sixth-most populous city in the state, and thirteenth-most populous community when census-designated places are included. The surrounding borough, encompassing suburbs both north and south of the city along the Tongass Highway (most of which are commonly regarded as a part of Ketchikan, albeit not a part of the city itself), in addition to small rural settlements accessible mostly by water, registered a population of 13,948 in that same census.

Incorporated on August 25, 1900, Ketchikan is the earliest extant incorporated city in Alaska, because consolidation or unification elsewhere in Alaska resulted in the dissolution of those communities' city governments. Ketchikan is located on Revillagigedo Island, so named in 1793 by Captain George Vancouver.

Ketchikan is named after Ketchikan Creek, which flows through the town, emptying into the Tongass Narrows a short distance southeast of its downtown. "Ketchikan" comes from the Tlingit name for the creek, Kitschk-hin, the meaning of which is unclear. It may mean "the river belonging to Kitschk"; other accounts claim it means "Thundering Wings of an Eagle". In modern Tlingit, this name is Kichx̱áan.

One of Ketchikan's ZIP codes, 99950, is the ZIP code with the highest number in the United States.

== History ==
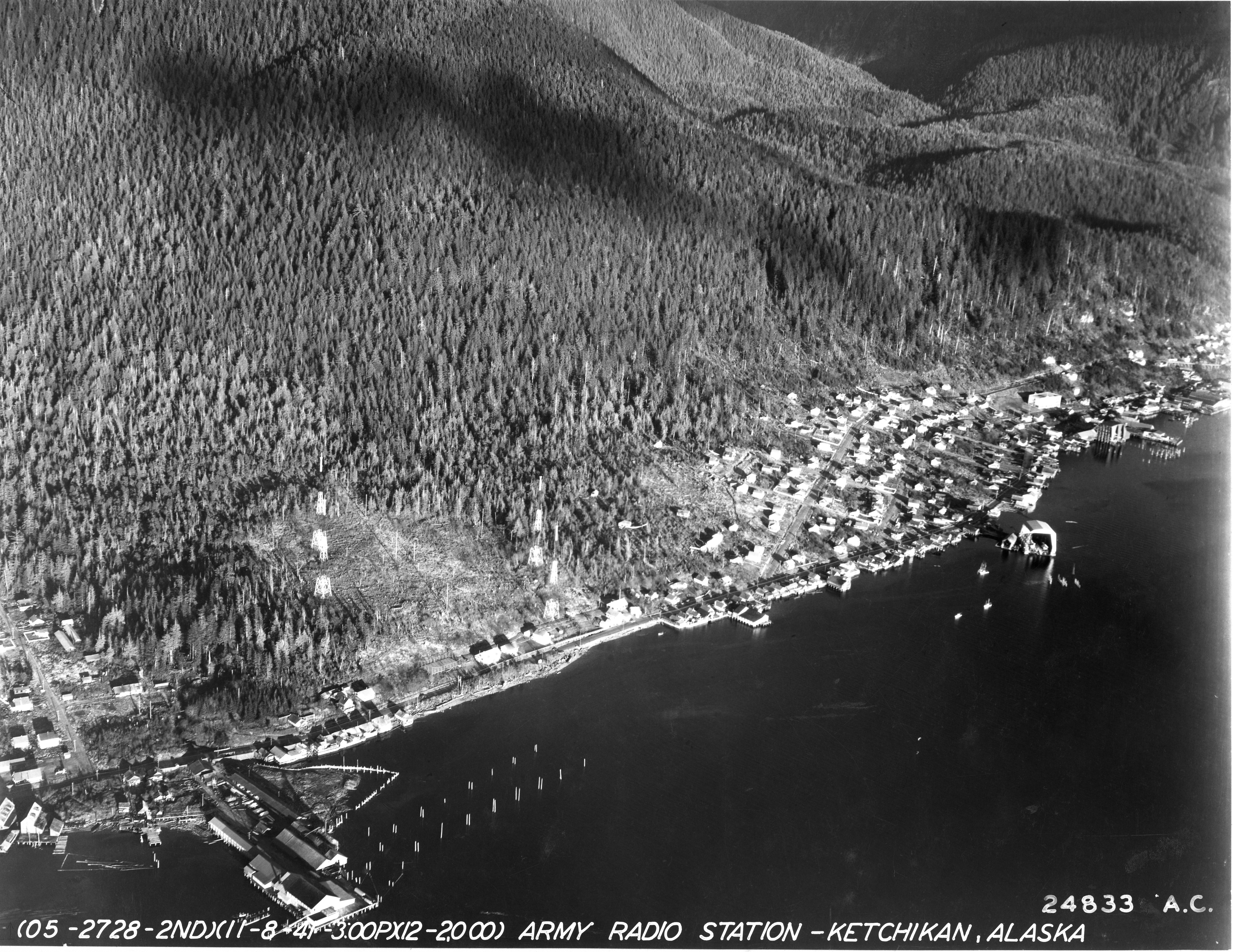
View of Ketchikan in the 1940s

Ketchikan Creek served as a summer fish camp for Tlingit natives for many years before the town was established by Mike Martin in 1885. He was sent to the area by an Oregon canning company to assess prospects. He established the saltery Clark & Martin and a general store with Nova Scotia native George Clark, who had been foreman at a cannery that burned down.

Ketchikan became known as "Alaska's first city" due to its strategic position at the southern tip of the Inside Passage, connecting the Gulf of Alaska to Puget Sound.

In 1905 a mission house was built, which in 1909 became the Yates Memorial Hospital. In 2020, the National Trust for Historic Preservation named the former hospital as one of America's most endangered historic places.

== Totem poles ==
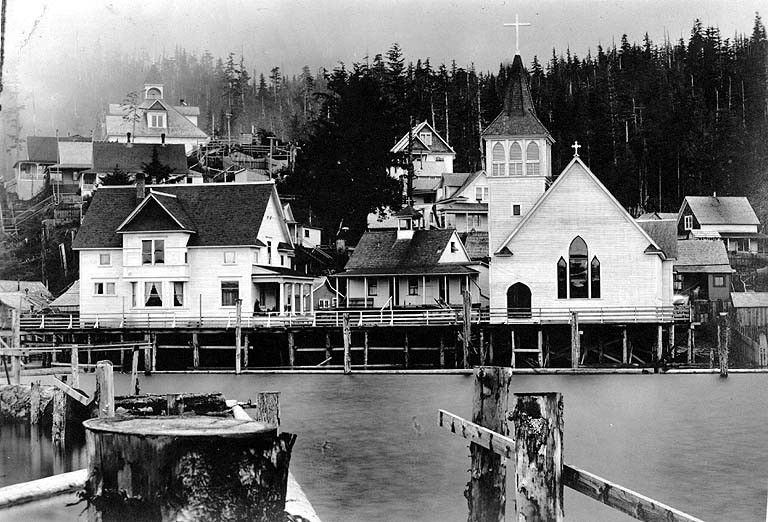
Ketchikan waterfront c. 1918

Ketchikan has the world's largest collection of standing totem poles, found throughout the city and at four major locations: Saxman Totem Park, Totem Bight State Park, Potlatch Park, and the Totem Heritage Center. Most of the totems at Saxman Totem Park and Totem Bight State Park are recarvings of older poles, a practice that began during the Roosevelt Administration through the Civilian Conservation Corps. The Totem Heritage Center displays preserved 19th-century poles rescued from abandoned village sites near Ketchikan. The Chief Kyan pole in Whale Park in the city center is one of the featured background images in most US passports.

According to art historian Lauren Kilroy-Ewbank, the Chief Johnson totem pole in Ketchikan is the most photographed totem pole in Alaska.

== Geography ==
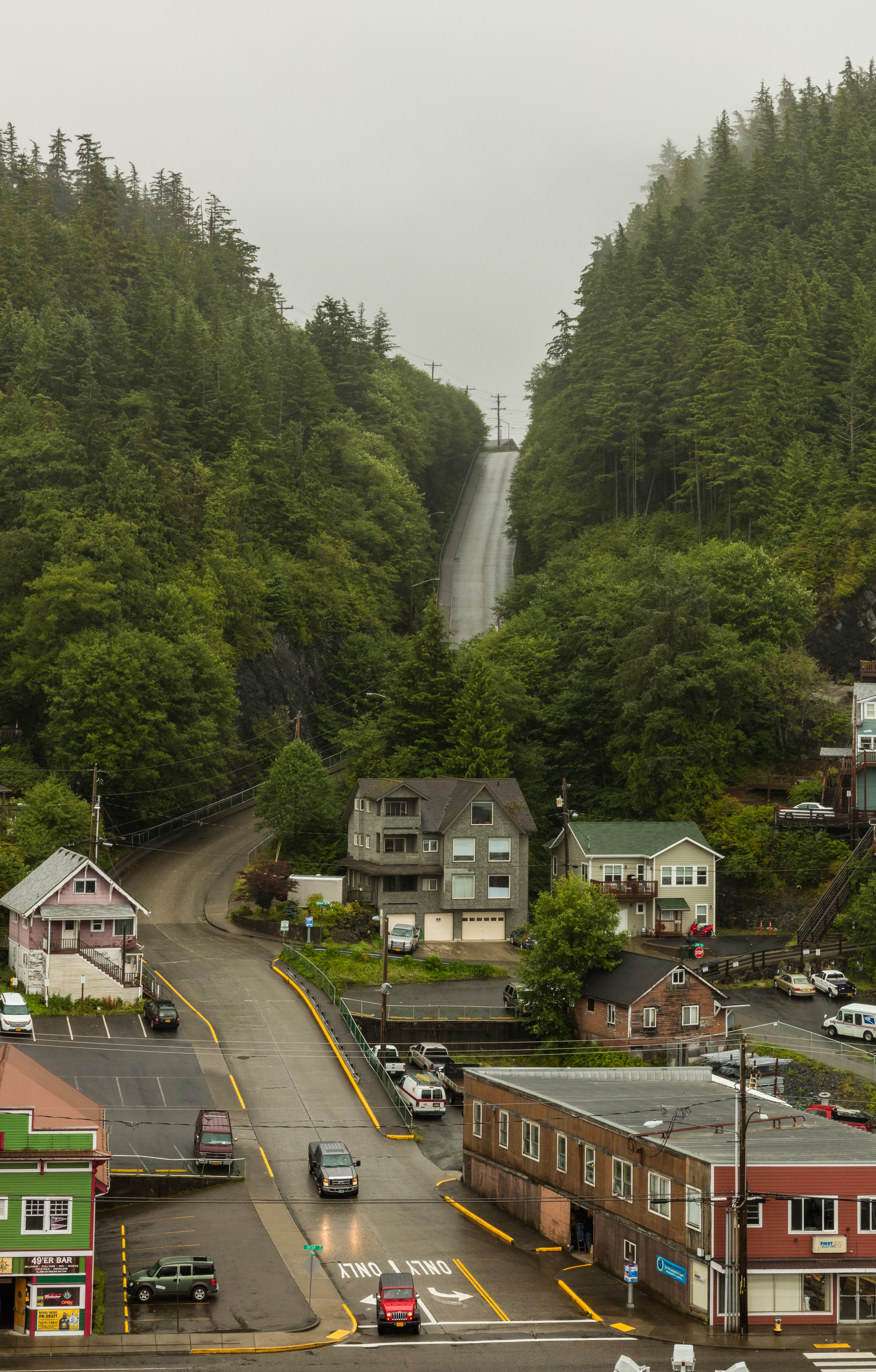
Example of the extremely steep roads in Ketchikan

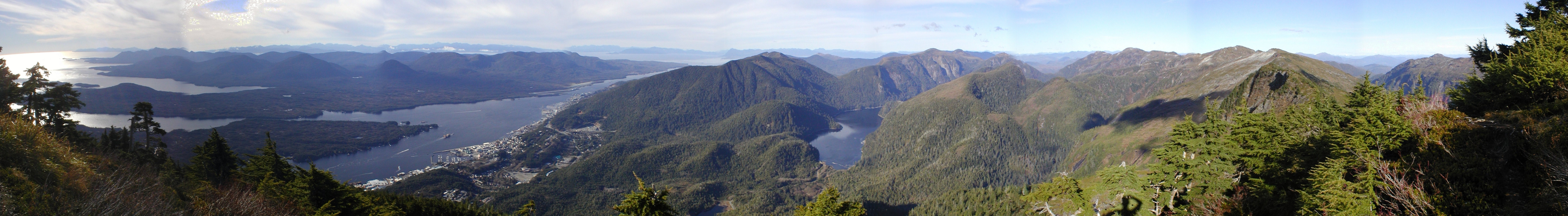
A panorama of downtown Ketchikan and surrounding terrain from the peak of Deer Mountain in October 2004. Pennock Island divides the Tongass Narrows on the left, and Gravina Island lies on the distant side of the Narrows.

Ketchikan's GPS geographic coordinates are latitude 55.342 (slightly south of both Copenhagen, Denmark at 55.676 and Glasgow, Scotland at 55.864) and longitude -131.648. The city is located in southernmost Southeast Alaska on Revillagigedo Island, 700 miles (1,100 km) northwest of Seattle, Washington, 235 miles (378 km) southeast of Juneau, Alaska, and 88 miles (142 km) northwest of Prince Rupert, British Columbia, Canada. It is surrounded by the Tongass National Forest, which is managed by the United States Forest Service from its headquarters in the Ketchikan Federal Building downtown, and to the south by the Tongass Narrows, a narrow east–west saltwater channel, which is part of the Inside Passage.

Due to its steep and forested terrain, Ketchikan is long and narrow with much of the built-up area being located along, or no more than a few city blocks from, the waterfront. Elevations of inhabited areas range from just above sea level to about 300 feet (91 m). Deer Mountain, a 3,001-foot (915 m) peak, rises immediately east of the city's downtown area.

According to the United States Census Bureau, the city has a total area of 5.9 square miles (15.3 km^{2}). 4.4 square miles (11.3 km^{2}) of it is land and 1.5 square miles (4.0 km^{2}) of it (29.14%) is water.

The half-mile (800 m) wide channel called the Tongass Narrows separates Ketchikan from Gravina Island, where Ketchikan International Airport is located.

== Climate ==
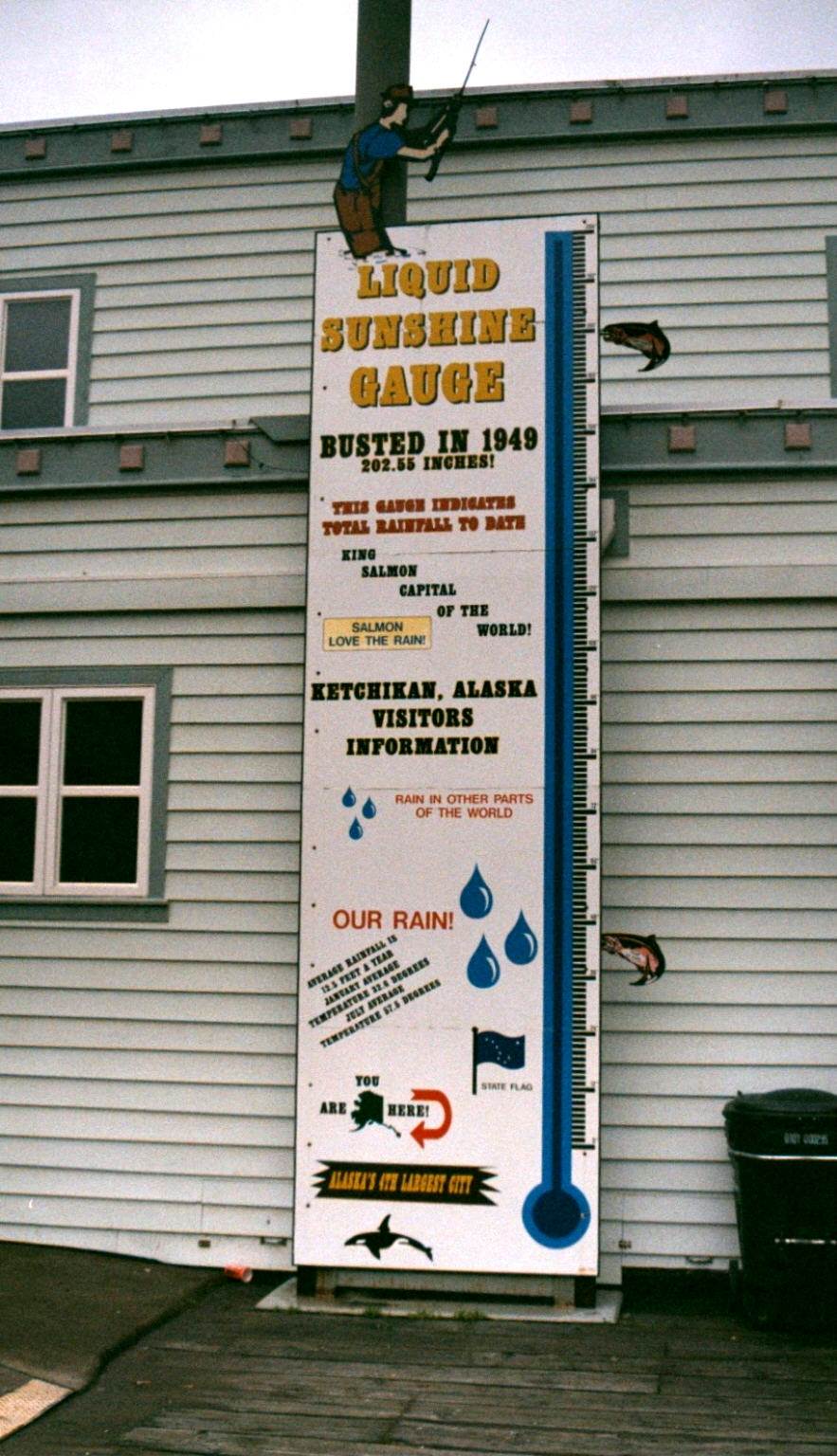
Ketchikan's Liquid Sunshine Gauge. The town experienced record annual rainfall in 1949, with 202.55 inches (5,145 mm) measured.

Ketchikan has a mild maritime or oceanic climate (Köppen: Cfb, Trewartha Dolk), characterized by heavy cloud cover, high humidity and abundant rainfall throughout the year (even in the driest month), earning it the nickname of the "Rain Capital of Alaska". Prolonged breaks in the very wet weather occur only when very cold air from the Yukon penetrates the coastal mountains, bringing frigid and clear conditions all the way to the coast, and often leaving residents unprepared as water pipes will then freeze. This occurred notably in January of 1916, 1950 and 1969.

Outside of these continental outbreaks winters are chilly but milder than its latitude alone may suggest: January has a 24-hour average of 35.6 °F (2.0 °C) with an average daytime high of 39.7 °F (4.3 °C) and an overnight low of 31.5 °F (−0.3 °C). Further east and away from moderating maritime influence, winters on these parallels in inland North America are much colder. Summers are mild, as August's temperature averages 59.0 °F (15.0 °C) with an average daytime high of 64.7 °F (18.2 °C) and an overnight low of 53.3 °F (11.8 °C). Rainfall averages 149.54 inches (3,798 mm) per year, falling more heavily in autumn and winter. On average, the growing season (non-freezing temperatures) lasts about 6.3 months or 191 days, extending from about April 19 to about October 27.

The record high temperature in Ketchikan was 96 °F (36 °C) on June 25, 1913. The record low temperature was −7 °F (−22 °C) on January 23, 1916. The wettest year was 1949 with 202.55 inches (5,145 mm) and the driest year was 1995 with 88.45 inches (2,247 mm). The most rainfall in one month was 53.85 inches (1,368 mm) during November 1917 and the most rainfall in 24 hours was 8.71 inches (221 mm) on October 11, 1977. The most snowfall in one month was 45.1 inches (1.15 m) in January 1971.

Climate data for Ketchikan, Alaska (Ketchikan International Airport), 1991–2020 normals, extremes 1910–present
| Month | Jan | Feb | Mar | Apr | May | Jun | Jul | Aug | Sep | Oct | Nov | Dec | Year |
|---|---|---|---|---|---|---|---|---|---|---|---|---|---|
| Record high °F (°C) | 62 (17) | 63 (17) | 69 (21) | 75 (24) | 93 (34) | 96 (36) | 92 (33) | 89 (32) | 80 (27) | 72 (22) | 65 (18) | 62 (17) | 96 (36) |
| Mean maximum °F (°C) | 50.4 (10.2) | 49.9 (9.9) | 53.5 (11.9) | 61.3 (16.3) | 70.8 (21.6) | 76.1 (24.5) | 76.3 (24.6) | 75.3 (24.1) | 67.9 (19.9) | 59.1 (15.1) | 52.5 (11.4) | 49.6 (9.8) | 79.6 (26.4) |
| Mean daily maximum °F (°C) | 39.7 (4.3) | 40.9 (4.9) | 43.6 (6.4) | 49.8 (9.9) | 56.9 (13.8) | 61.3 (16.3) | 64.5 (18.1) | 64.7 (18.2) | 58.9 (14.9) | 51.1 (10.6) | 43.7 (6.5) | 40.2 (4.6) | 51.3 (10.7) |
| Daily mean °F (°C) | 35.6 (2.0) | 36.2 (2.3) | 38.0 (3.3) | 43.5 (6.4) | 50.1 (10.1) | 55.3 (12.9) | 58.8 (14.9) | 59.0 (15.0) | 53.6 (12.0) | 46.2 (7.9) | 39.7 (4.3) | 36.4 (2.4) | 46.0 (7.8) |
| Mean daily minimum °F (°C) | 31.5 (−0.3) | 31.5 (−0.3) | 32.4 (0.2) | 37.2 (2.9) | 43.3 (6.3) | 49.3 (9.6) | 53.2 (11.8) | 53.3 (11.8) | 48.3 (9.1) | 41.3 (5.2) | 35.6 (2.0) | 32.6 (0.3) | 40.8 (4.9) |
| Mean minimum °F (°C) | 13.7 (−10.2) | 18.3 (−7.6) | 19.2 (−7.1) | 27.9 (−2.3) | 33.4 (0.8) | 40.0 (4.4) | 45.6 (7.6) | 44.7 (7.1) | 37.5 (3.1) | 29.7 (−1.3) | 22.6 (−5.2) | 18.1 (−7.7) | 7.3 (−13.7) |
| Record low °F (°C) | −7 (−22) | 2 (−17) | 3 (−16) | 12 (−11) | 25 (−4) | 31 (−1) | 36 (2) | 34 (1) | 28 (−2) | 17 (−8) | 5 (−15) | −1 (−18) | −7 (−22) |
| Average precipitation inches (mm) | 16.17 (411) | 11.80 (300) | 10.98 (279) | 10.25 (260) | 8.68 (220) | 7.02 (178) | 7.33 (186) | 11.30 (287) | 14.30 (363) | 18.37 (467) | 17.07 (434) | 16.27 (413) | 149.54 (3,798) |
| Average precipitation days (≥ 0.01 in) | 22.0 | 17.0 | 20.6 | 19.4 | 16.1 | 16.4 | 16.0 | 16.8 | 19.5 | 22.8 | 23.6 | 22.4 | 232.6 |
Source 1: NOAA
Source 2: National Weather Service

== Demographics ==
Historical population
| Census | Pop. | Note | %± |
|---|---|---|---|
| 1890 | 40 | | — |
| 1900 | 459 | | 1,047.5% |
| 1910 | 1,613 | | 251.4% |
| 1920 | 2,458 | | 52.4% |
| 1930 | 3,796 | | 54.4% |
| 1940 | 4,695 | | 23.7% |
| 1950 | 5,305 | | 13.0% |
| 1960 | 6,483 | | 22.2% |
| 1970 | 6,994 | | 7.9% |
| 1980 | 7,198 | | 2.9% |
| 1990 | 8,263 | | 14.8% |
| 2000 | 7,922 | | −4.1% |
| 2010 | 8,050 | | 1.6% |
| 2020 | 8,192 | | 1.8% |
U.S. Decennial Census

Ketchikan first appeared on the 1890 U.S. Census as the unincorporated village of "Kichikan." Of its 40 residents, 26 were Native, nine were White and five were Creole (Mixed Russian and Native). It returned as Ketchikan beginning in 1900 and in every successive census. It incorporated as a city also in 1900.

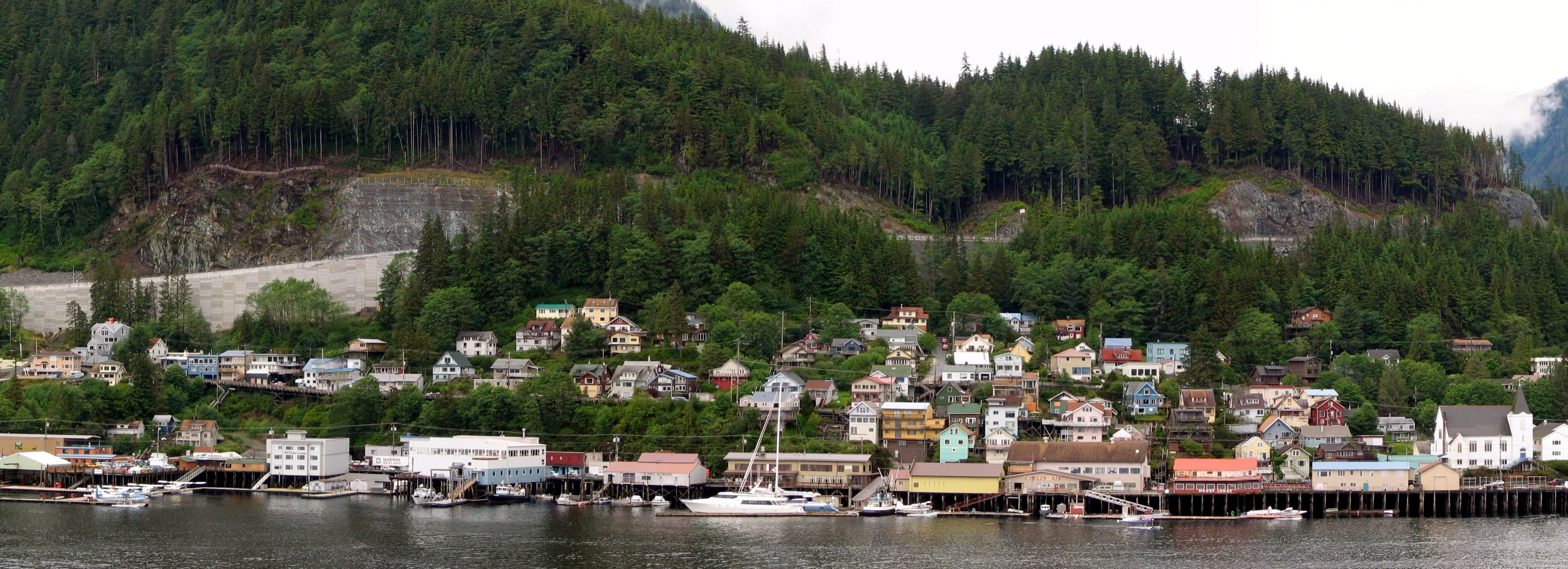
Ketchikan's Newtown neighborhood, between Downtown and the West End, its two largest neighborhoods. First Lutheran Church, at the right edge of this photo, is listed on the National Register of Historic Places. East of the church (beyond view of the photo), three adjoining streets were named Warren, G, and Harding following President Harding's visit to Alaska in 1923.

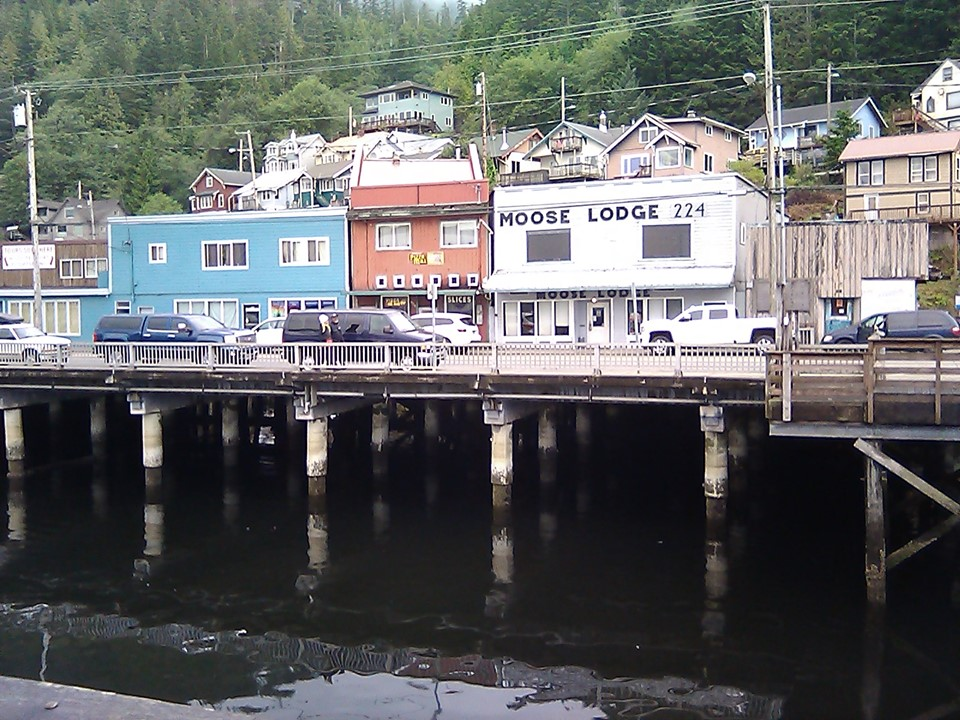
Ketchikan as seen from the dock near the cruise terminal

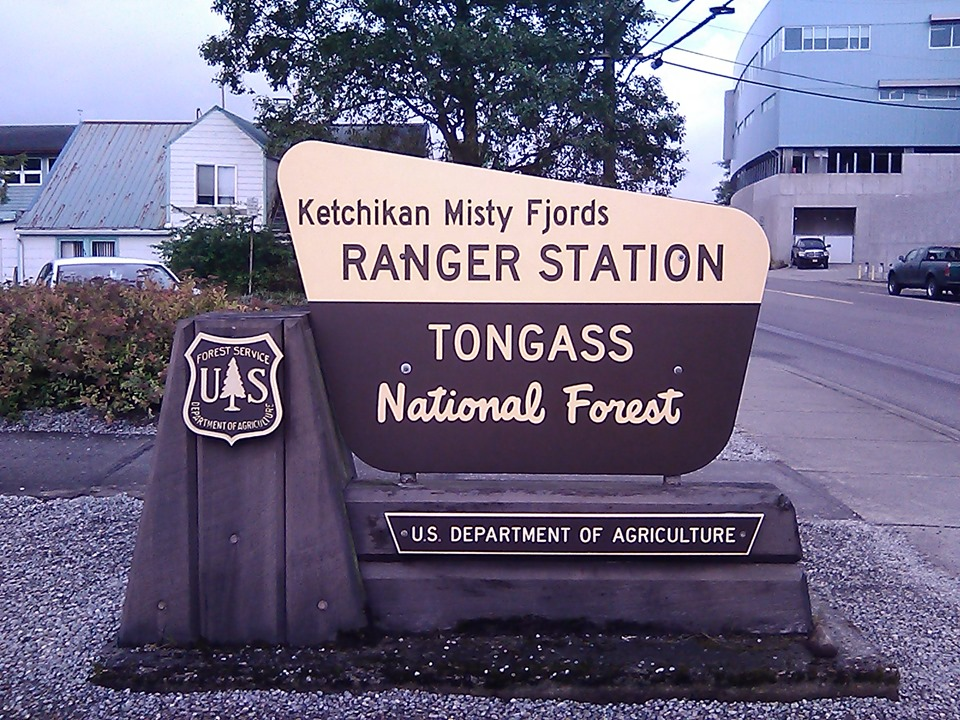
The Ketchikan Misty Fjords Ranger Station

=== 2020 census ===
As of the 2020 census, Ketchikan had a population of 8,192. The median age was 39.0 years. 21.8% of residents were under the age of 18 and 16.0% of residents were 65 years of age or older. For every 100 females there were 100.8 males, and for every 100 females age 18 and over there were 99.9 males age 18 and over.

94.3% of residents lived in urban areas, while 5.7% lived in rural areas.

There were 3,247 households in Ketchikan, of which 30.3% had children under the age of 18 living in them. Of all households, 36.8% were married-couple households, 23.9% were households with a male householder and no spouse or partner present, and 29.1% were households with a female householder and no spouse or partner present. About 33.2% of all households were made up of individuals and 12.1% had someone living alone who was 65 years of age or older.

There were 3,830 housing units, of which 15.2% were vacant. The homeowner vacancy rate was 2.4% and the rental vacancy rate was 13.6%.

Racial composition as of the 2020 census
| Race | Number | Percent |
|---|---|---|
| White | 4,269 | 52.1% |
| Black or African American | 83 | 1.0% |
| American Indian and Alaska Native | 1,608 | 19.6% |
| Asian | 1,022 | 12.5% |
| Native Hawaiian and Other Pacific Islander | 19 | 0.2% |
| Some other race | 139 | 1.7% |
| Two or more races | 1,052 | 12.8% |
| Hispanic or Latino (of any race) | 411 | 5.0% |

=== 2010 census ===
As of 2010, there were 8,050 people, 3,259 households, and 1,885 families residing in the city. There were 3,731 housing units at an average density of 848.0 per square mile (327.4/km^{2}). The racial makeup of the city was 60.7% White, 16.7% Native American (8.3% Tlingit-Haida, 1.9% Tsimshian), 10.8% Asian (9.4% Filipino), 10.0% from two or more races, 0.8% Black or African American, 0.3% Pacific Islander, and 0.7% some other race. 4.4% of the population were Hispanic or Latino (2.6% Mexican) of any race.

Of the 3,259 households, 30.8% had children under the age of 18 living with them, 37.6% were headed by married couples living together, 13.7% had a female householder with no husband present, and 42.2% were non-families. 33.0% of all households were made up of individuals, and 9.0% were someone living alone who was 65 years of age or older. The average household size was 2.41, and the average family size was 3.07.

The population was spread by age ranges, with 23.9% under the age of 18, 9.5% from 18 to 24, 26.6% from 25 to 44, 29.3% from 45 to 64, and 10.7% who were 65 years of age or older. The median age was 36.7 years. For every 100 females, there were 103.1 males. For every 100 females age 18 and over, there were 102.5 males.

=== 2017 estimates ===
In 2017, the population density was 1,829.5 per square mile (714.1/km^{2}). The ACS-estimated median and average annual incomes for a household in the city were $56,372 and $70,490, respectively. The median and average incomes for a family were $68,438 and $84,518, respectively. The per capita income for the city was $30,474. About 12.4% of the population, including 19.8% of those under 18-years old, were below the poverty line.

=== Language ===
90.0% spoke English, 6.0% Tagalog, 1.8% Spanish, and 0.7% Tsimshian as their first language.

== Media ==
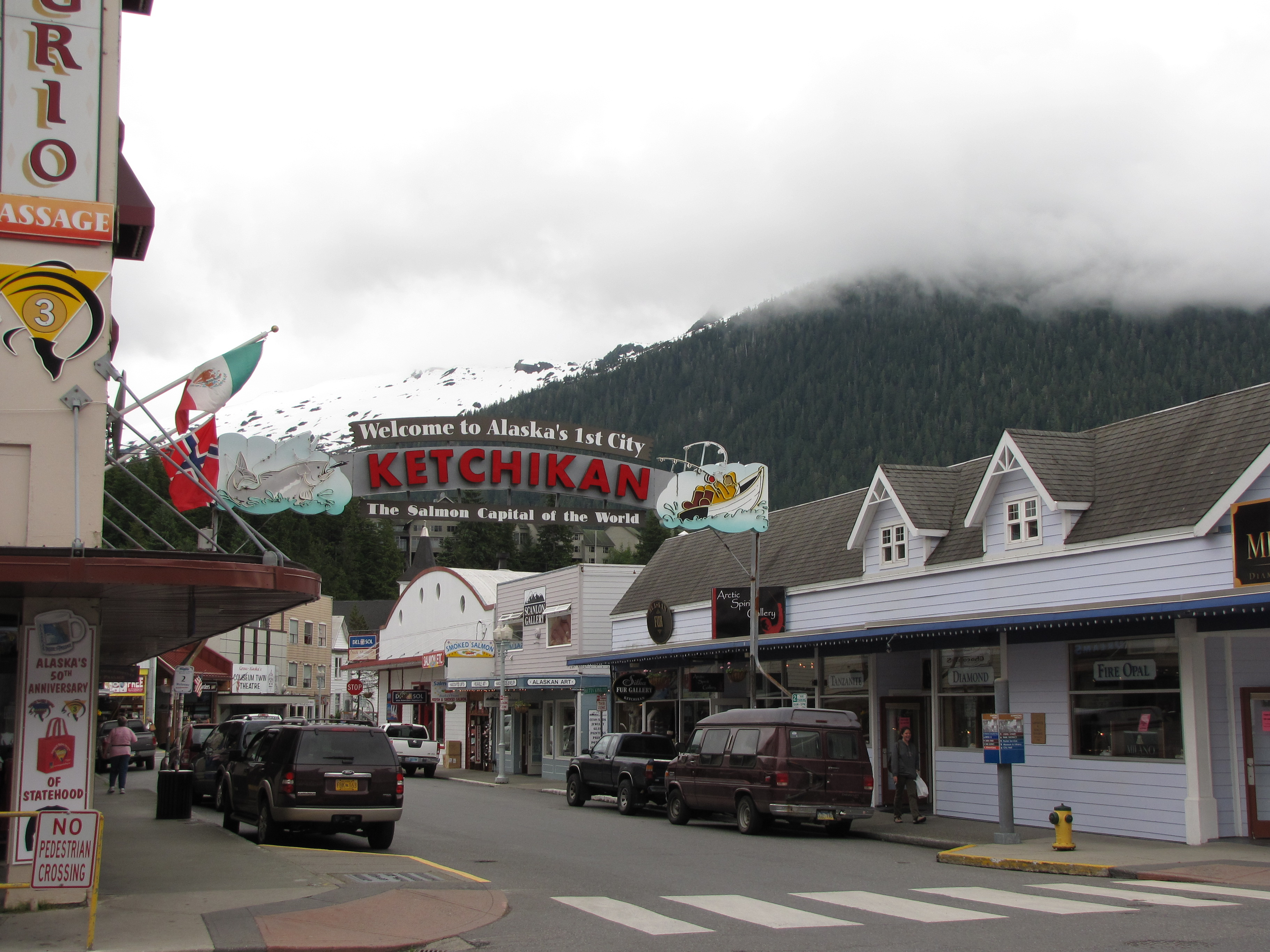
Ketchikan sign, which arches over Mission Street. Front Street is in the immediate foreground.

Ketchikan is home to four radio stations: KTKN-AM 930, KGTW-FM 106.7, KFMJ-FM 99.9, and community-owned NPR-affiliated KRBD-FM 105.3.

Ketchikan has one over-the-air broadcast television station, KUBD, Channel 13 digital and 4 visual, a CBS network affiliate.

Ketchikan also houses the publishing offices of the Ketchikan Daily News.

The region has local cable television programming provided by Ketchikan Public Utilities, including public meetings, Southeast Alaska programming, Ketchikan High School sports and events, local history, gardening and scenes, and a calendar of upcoming local events; local television signals carried on the cable system are also translations of Seattle and Anchorage stations.

== Government and infrastructure ==
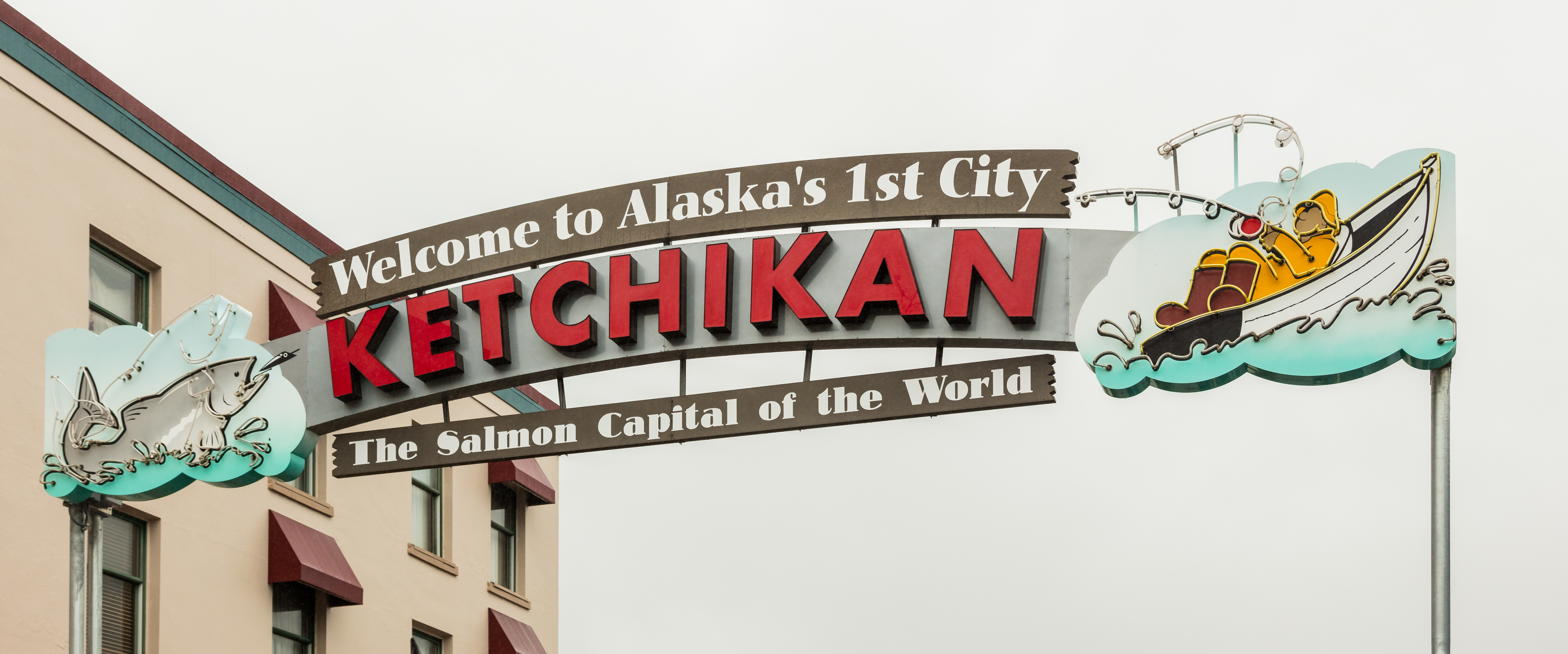
Welcome sign

The City of Ketchikan operates under a council-manager form of government. The Ketchikan Gateway Borough includes both the City of Ketchikan and the City of Saxman and encompasses more than 6,000 square miles (16,000 km^{2}) from the Canada–US border to just south of Wrangell. The Alaska Marine Highway System has its headquarters in Ketchikan.

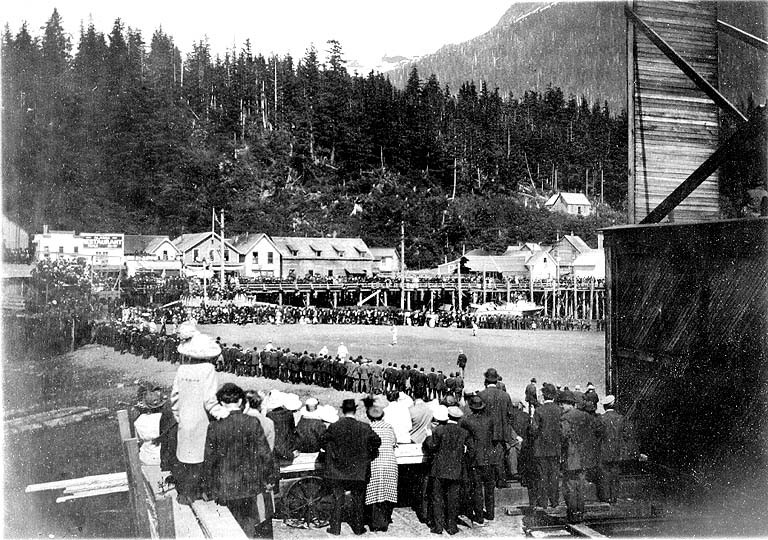
Undated photo of a baseball game in Ketchikan by John Nathan Cobb

Over the decades, Ketchikan has produced a number of political figures of note to Alaska in general. In territorial days, Norman Ray "Doc" Walker, a Canadian-born pharmacist practicing in Ketchikan, was the first career member of the Alaska Legislature. Walker served in the territorial Senate for 16 years before losing reelection in 1948. Ketchikan native Terry Gardiner was the youngest person elected to the Alaska House of Representatives, at age 22.

The United States Coast Guard maintains a large shore installation, Coast Guard Base Ketchikan, south of the downtown area, which serves as a home port to three cutters and as a regional maintenance base for Alaska.

One of Ketchikan's two ZIP codes, 99950, is the highest numbered in the United States.

== Economy and industries ==
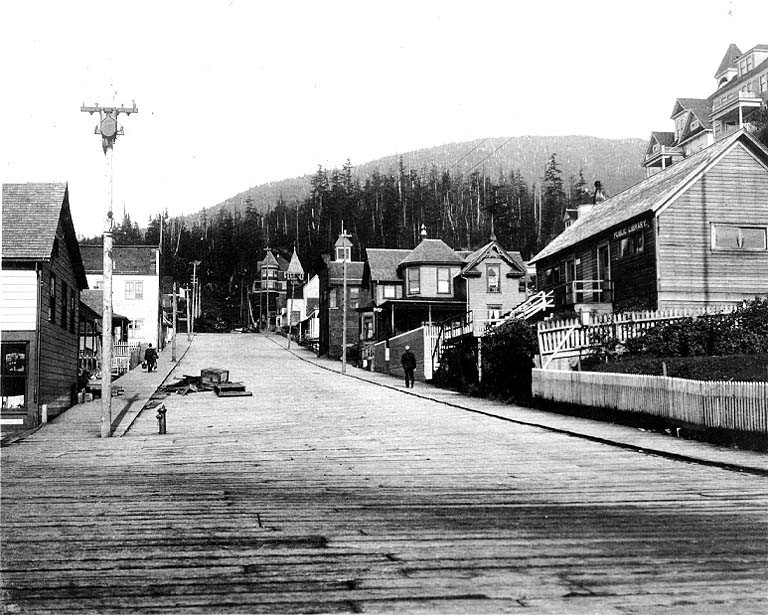
A main street in Ketchikan, September 1908

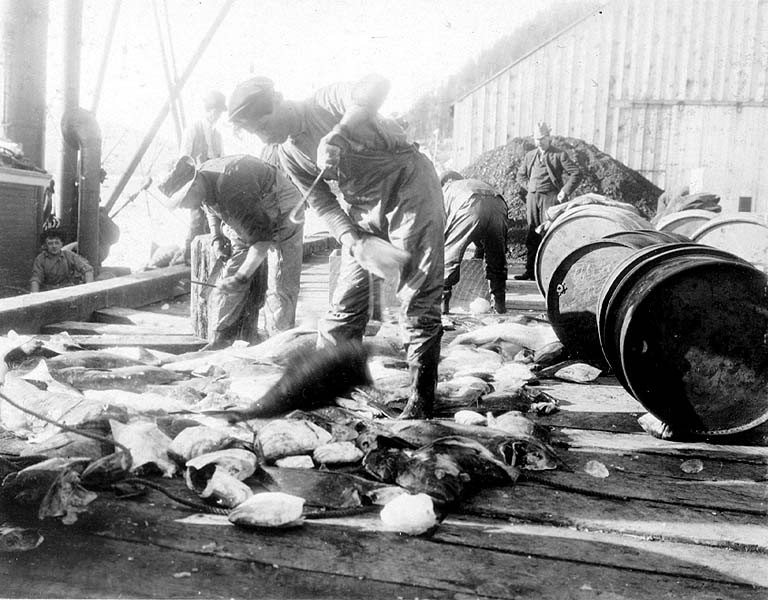
Fishermen dressing and packing halibut at a dock in Ketchikan, October 1910

A major and first port of entry into Alaska, Ketchikan's economy has been based on fishing industries, canneries in particular, tourism, government, and forestry. Average annual civilian employment in 2017 was 4,070, with a substantial seasonal work force peaking in July.

The area near the mouth of Ketchikan Creek earned Ketchikan a measure of infamy during the first half of the 20th century for a red-light district known as Creek Street, with brothels aligned on either side of the creek.

Ketchikan's economy is currently based upon government services, tourism and commercial fishing. Civic boosters have dubbed the community the "Salmon Capital of the World."

Ketchikan also receives a large number of tourists, both by air and sea, due to its popularity as a cruise ship stop. In 2018, Ketchikan Harbour saw 40 different cruise ships making more than 500 stops in the harbor and bringing more than 1,073,000 visitors to Ketchikan. The Great Alaskan Lumberjack Show, a lumberjack show, is performed near Ketchikan Creek between May and September.

The Misty Fiords National Monument is one of the area's major attractions, and the Tongass National Forest has long been headquartered in Ketchikan, mostly in the city's historic Federal Building. For most of the latter half of the 20th century, a large portion of Ketchikan's economy and life centered on the Ketchikan Pulp Company pulp mill in nearby Ward Cove. The mill closed in 1997 in the wake of the passage of the Tongass Timber Reform Act of 1990, which reduced timber harvest targets in the national forest.

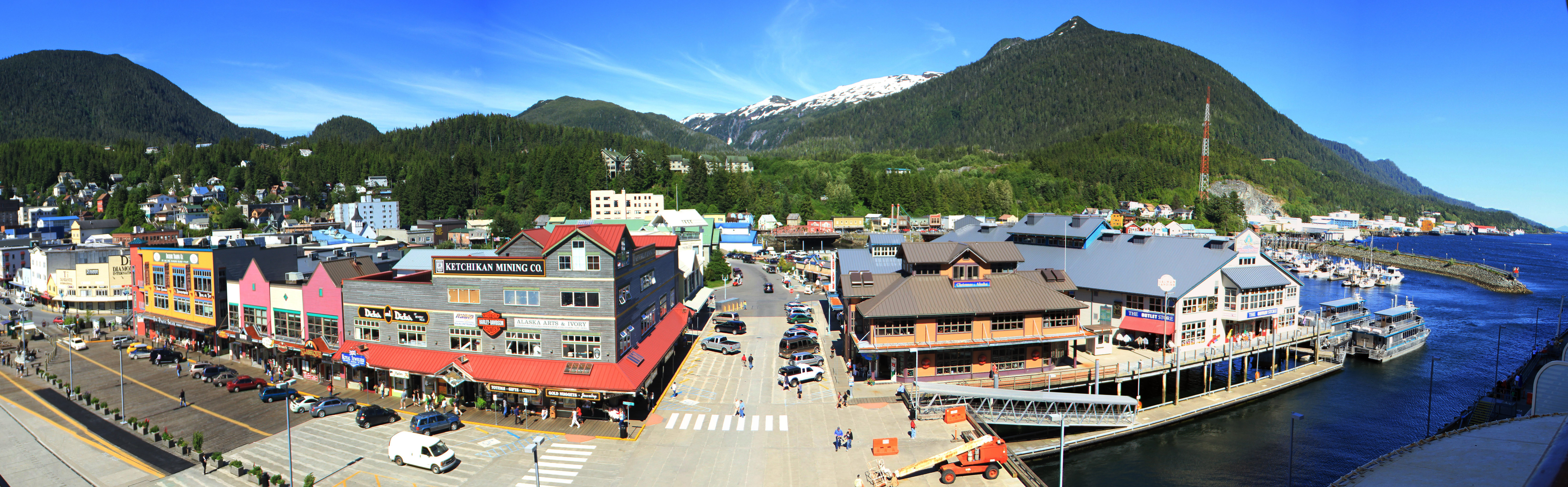
Downtown Ketchikan, with seasonal storefronts along Front Street shown in the foreground. Cruise ship tourism drives a large part of the local economy from May to September each year.

=== Lumber ===
Ketchikan Pulp Company (KPC), a subsidiary of Louisiana-Pacific Corp., was headquartered just outside Ketchikan's city limits on the shores of Ward Cove. The company's pulp mill opened in the cove in 1954. A 1995 joint EPA and FBI investigation of the company revealed it had dumped contaminated wastewater and sludge in the waters around Ward Cove, leaving them classified as "impaired" by the EPA. KPC plead guilty to the charges and agreed to pay a $3 million fine.

In 1996, following the Clinton Administration's refusal to reinstate the original terms of KPC's timber contract, Louisiana-Pacific Corp. announced it would be shutting down the pulp mill, and did so in March 1997. A total of 514 direct year-round jobs and more than 500 indirect jobs were lost as a result.

=== Marine ===
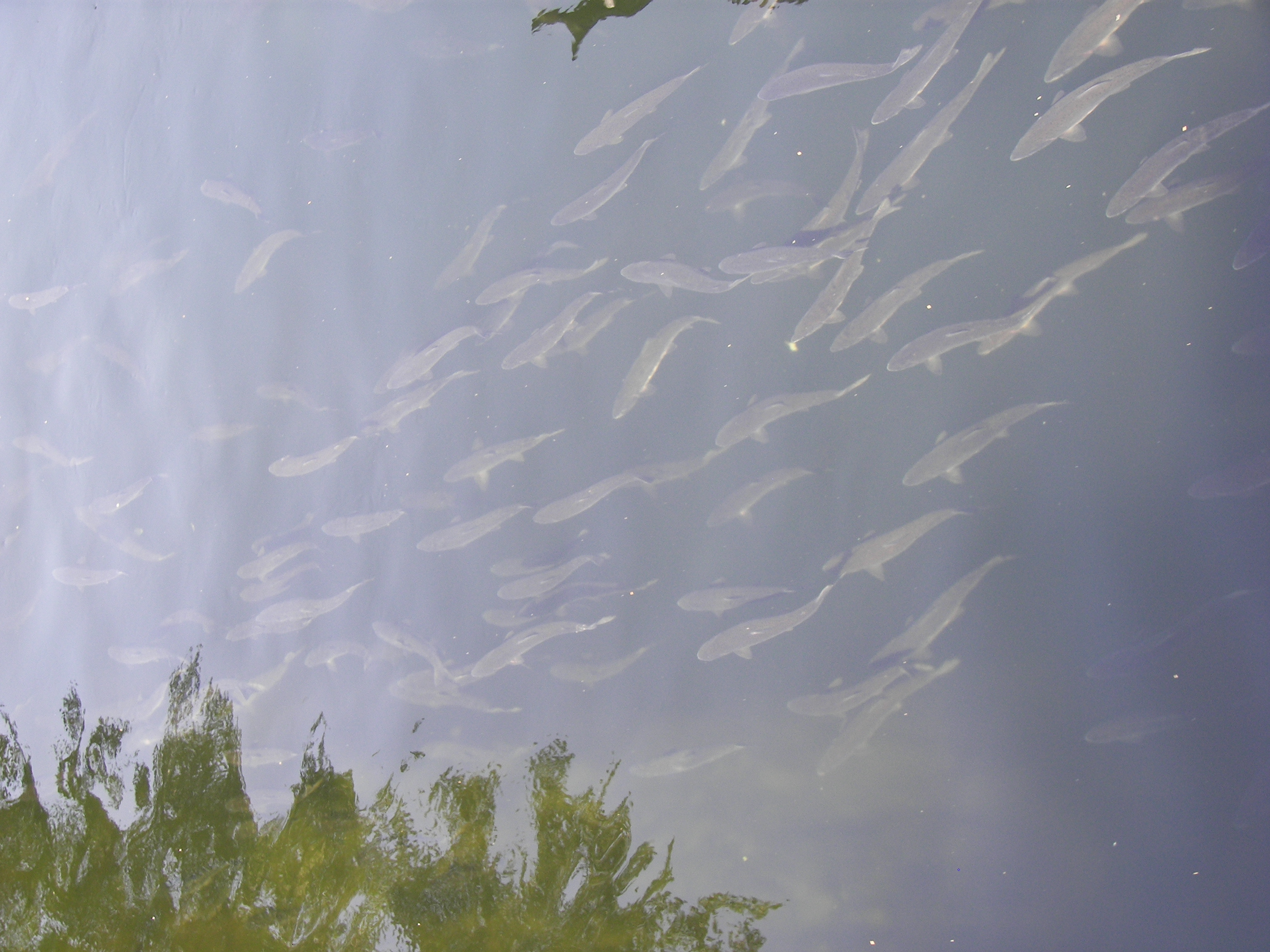
Salmon travel up the creek during spawning season to lay their eggs.

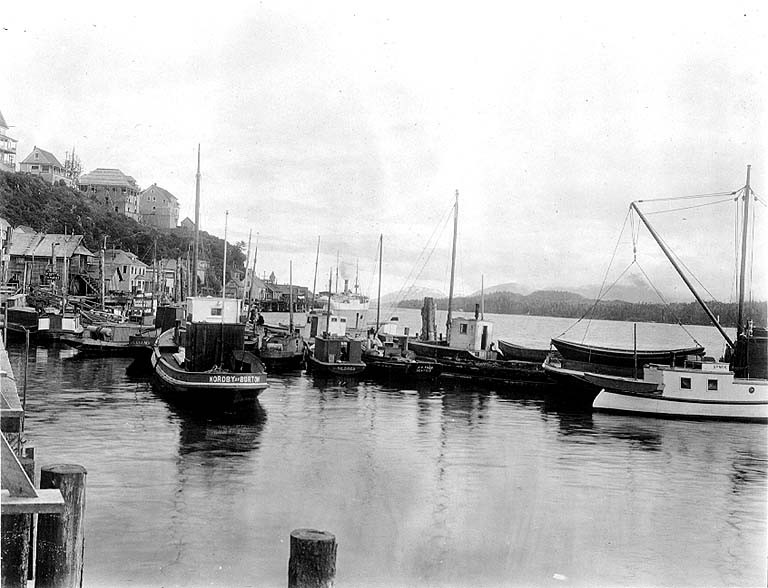
Fishing Fleet at Ketchikan on June 29, 1911

The Ketchikan Shipyard, located on land leased by the Alaska Industrial Development and Export Authority, consists of two dry-docks (10,000 ton and 2,500 ton) operated by Vigor Alaska, a subsidiary of Vigor Industrial. It successfully launched the M/V Susitna in April 2010. A prototype ferry craft for use by Alaska's Matanuska-Susitna Borough, the Susitna is the result of planning by Admiral Jay M. Cohen, former chief of the Office of Naval Research, and former Navy captain Lew Madden, then working as a project manager for Lockheed Martin.

The contract for two new Alaska-class day ferries in the Alaska Marine Highway was awarded to the shipyard on September 20, 2014, at a cost of $101 million.

=== Power and telecom ===
Companies involved in power and telecommunications include Ketchikan Public Utilities (KPU), which is city-owned, as well as GCI and Alaska Power and Telephone Company (AP&T).

== Transportation ==
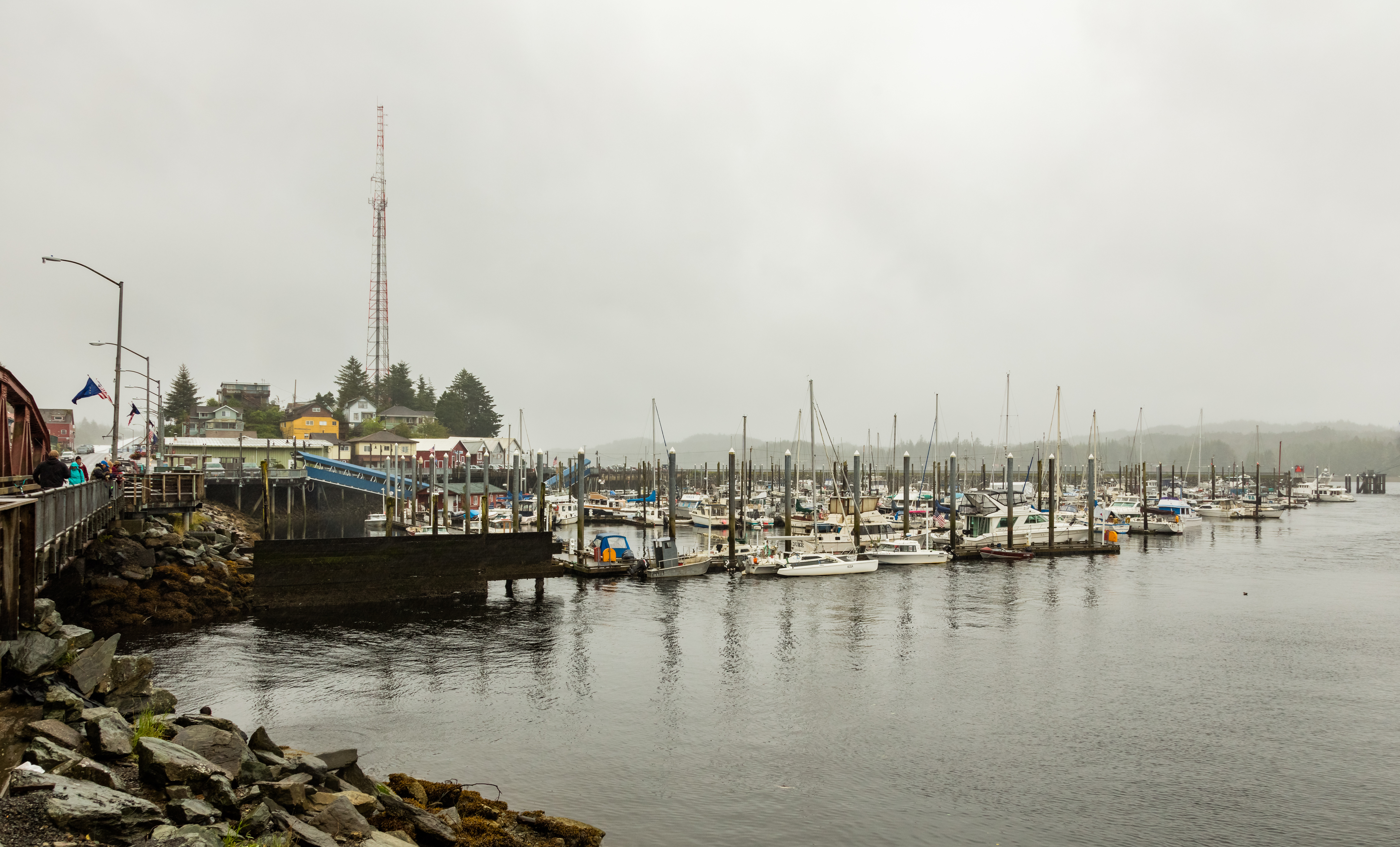
Port of Ketchikan

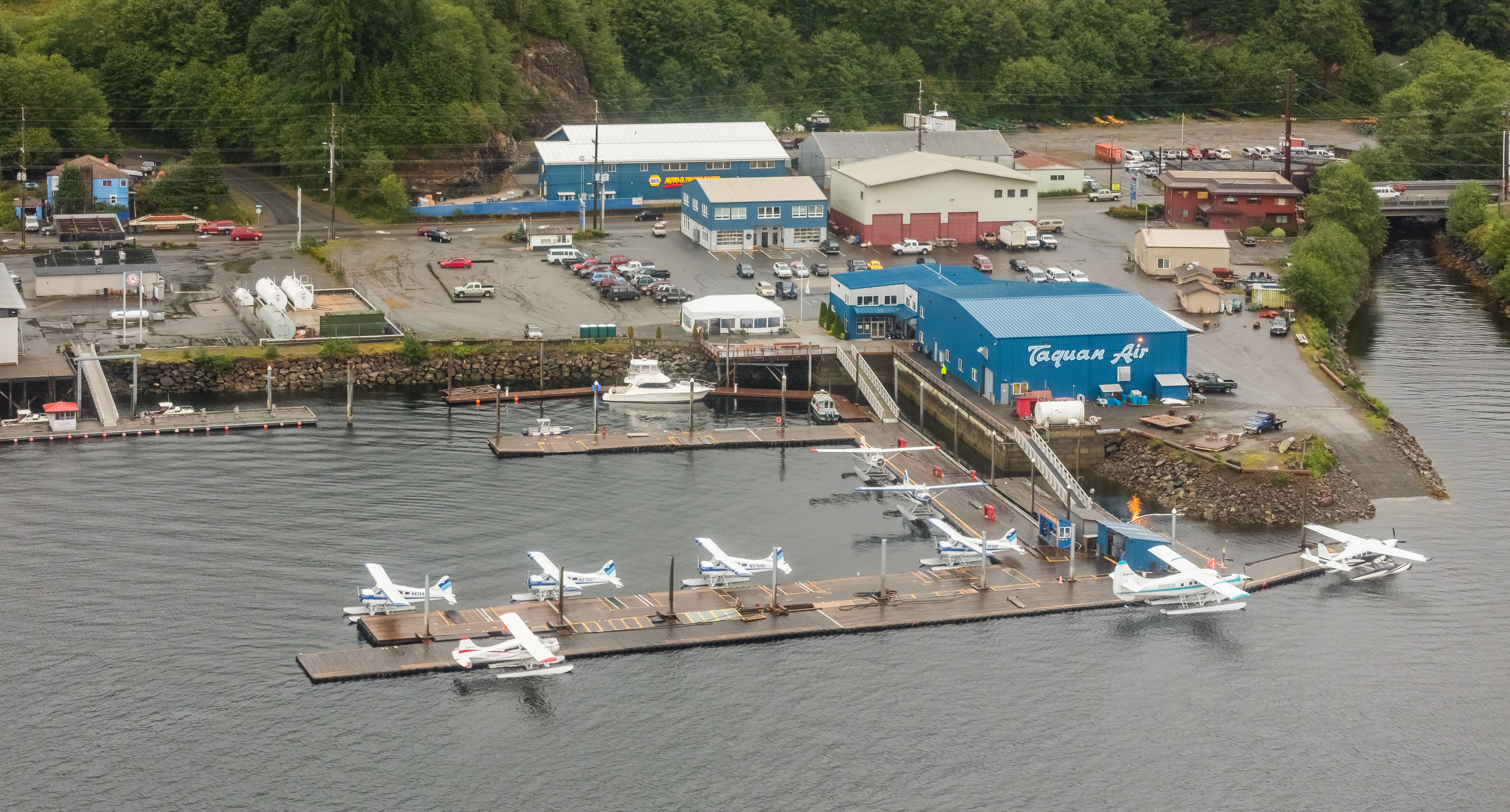
Port of seaplanes, one of the main modes of transportation

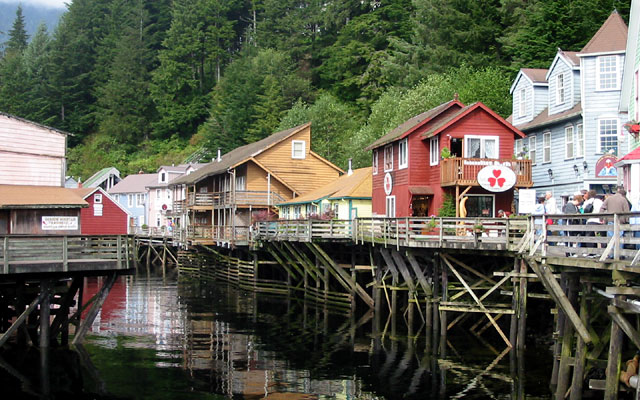
Looking down Creek Street, immediately outside of Ketchikan's downtown near the mouth of Ketchikan Creek. Creek Street, along with a block of Fourth Avenue in Fairbanks, were Alaska's two significant red-light districts until the passage of the Anti-Crib Laws in the early 1950s.

Ketchikan serves as both an air and marine transportation hub for southern Southeast Alaska.

The Ketchikan International Airport serves as both a gateway for Alaska Airlines nonstop jet service to and from Seattle, Juneau, Sitka and Wrangell, with direct service to Anchorage, and as a bush carrier and charter aircraft hub for destinations such as Hyder, Metlakatla and Prince of Wales Island communities. Flying time to/from Seattle, Washington is approximately ninety minutes, making Ketchikan easily accessible to travelers from the continental U.S. Delta Air Lines began operating seasonal service to Seattle in May 2015.

Ketchikan receives service from two separate ferry lines. Ketchikan is a major port along the Alaska Marine Highway System's Inside Passage route. Vessels depart northbound to Alaskan ports of call and southbound to Prince Rupert, British Columbia, a six-hour trip, where a connection can be made to the BC Ferries system, and Bellingham, Washington, a thirty-six-hour voyage. Sailings depart several times each week. Ketchikan also sees regular day service from the Alaska Marine Highway vessel MV Lituya, a day boat that shuttles between Ketchikan and its home port in Metlakatla, Alaska.

The Inter-Island Ferry Authority serves Ketchikan with daily service from its homeport in Hollis on Prince of Wales Island.

== Education ==
=== Colleges and universities ===
The former Ketchikan Community College became the Ketchikan campus of the University of Alaska Southeast during the late 1980s restructuring of the University of Alaska System. The campus is located on the uphill side of Ketchikan's West End neighborhood and consists of two buildings, the Paul Building and the Ziegler Building. Both are named for prominent Ketchikan residents of the early and mid 20th century, William Lewis Paul and Adolph Holton Ziegler, respectively.

=== Public education ===
- Ketchikan Gateway Borough School District
  - Ketchikan High School
  - Revilla Junior/Senior High School
  - Schoenbar Middle School

== Health care ==
The city of Ketchikan and its surrounding areas are primarily served by the PeaceHealth Ketchikan Medical Center, which operates 24 hours a day, 7 days a week.

== Sister cities and twin towns ==
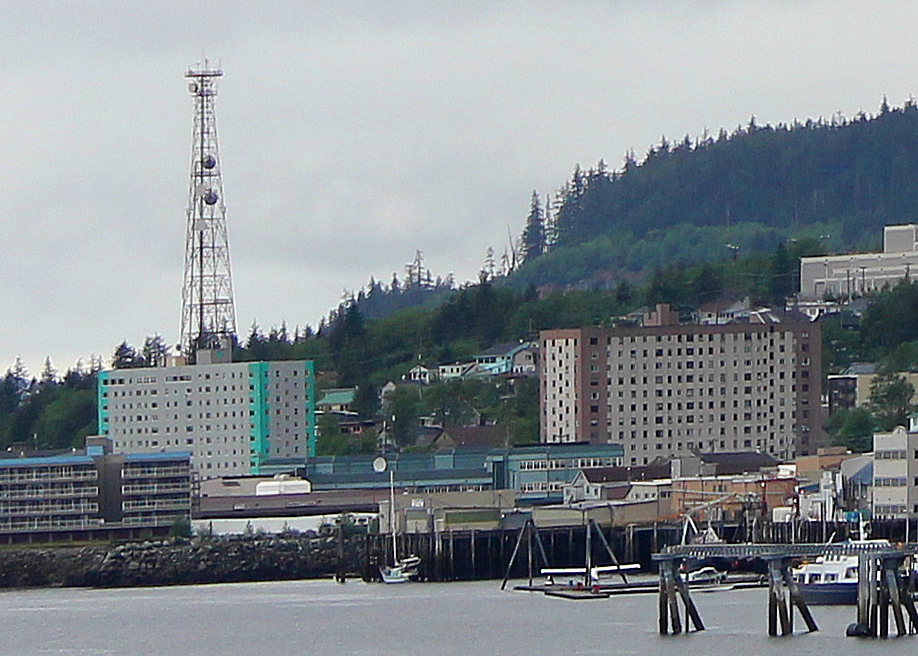
The West End (or Westend), located in the valleys of Carlanna and Hoadley creeks and across Tongass Narrows from Ketchikan International Airport, is Ketchikan's largest commercial and residential area. Shown are the city's tallest buildings, the Marine View Building and Tongass Towers. Ketchikan High School is partially visible at upper right.

- Palm Desert, California
- Kanayama, Gifu, Japan [former]

Ketchikan's former sister city of Kanayama, Gifu Prefecture, Japan, was incorporated along with four other cities into the larger city of Gero on March 1, 2004. An educational exchange program has been active between the two towns since 1986. Every year, Ketchikan and Kanayama exchange one teacher each to instruct middle-school level language classes in their respective tongues. In addition, Kanayama sends a group of students to Ketchikan during the spring, and students from Ketchikan travel to Kanayama the following summer. Ketchikan students travel across Japan, with the majority of their time spent in Kanayama with home-stay families, attending classes and touring the town.

== In popular culture ==
Several movies have been shot in Ketchikan, including The Silver Horde, Spawn of the North, Timber Tramps and Cry Vengeance, as well as episodes of the television programs The Love Boat and Baywatch. An episode of Mythbusters where the team sees if a ship made out of ice and sawdust can really float was filmed in Ketchikan in 2009. The National Geographic Channel series Alaska Wing Men in the episode "Fatal Crash" follows a National Transportation Safety Board investigator's site visit of a July 2010 bush pilot fatal crash near Ketchikan.

In The Young Pope, the character Pope Pius XIII sends several cardinals who upset him to Ketchikan as a punishment, which is depicted as a frozen wasteland.

In Arthur Miller's play Death of a Salesman, Uncle Ben must leave Willy to go to Ketchikan, where he presumably made part of his fortune.

Ketchikan is the setting for the Badd Brothers series by Jasinda Wilder.

== Notable people ==
- Danny Edwards (born 1951), professional golfer
- Nathan Jackson (born 1938), Tlingit artist famous for his carving of totem poles
- Roy Jones (1893–1974), first person to fly commercially in Alaska
- Jerry Mackie (born 1962), Alaska state legislator and businessman, born in Ketchikan
- Jack McBride, legislator and member of city council
- Tallie Medel, actress
- Frank Murkowski (born 1933), former United States Senator and Governor of Alaska; Murkowski grew up in Ketchikan, where his father was vice-president of the First National Bank of Ketchikan, which exists today as a Southeast regional bank called First Bank
- Lisa Murkowski (born 1957), second daughter of Frank Murkowski and his successor as U.S. Senator, born in Ketchikan
- Rudy Pankow (born 1998), Actor; born in Ketchikan
- William Paul (1885–1977), (Tlingit: Shgúndi), Tlingit statesman and leader in the Alaska Native Brotherhood born near Ketchikan. Paul was the first Alaska Native to become an attorney and first elected to the Alaska Territorial legislature
- Ray Troll (born 1954), artist famous for blending art and science in his fish-laden drawings
- Don Watts (born 1956 or 1957), farmer and entrepreneur

== See also ==
- National Register of Historic Places listings in Ketchikan Gateway Borough, Alaska
- Seathwaite, Allerdale, wettest settlement in the United Kingdom
