= Walker House =

Walker House, and variations including Walker Homestead and Walker Barn, may refer to:

- Walker House (Daphne, Alabama), listed on the National Register of Historic Places (NRHP) in Baldwin County, Alabama
- Joseph M. Walker House, Mobile, Alabama
- Walker-Klinner Farm, Maplesville, Alabama
- Walker-Broderick House, Ketchikan, Alaska
- O. E. Walker House, Kingman, Arizona
- Harry Walker House, Tempe, Arizona, listed on the NRHP in Maricopa County, Arizona
- Walker House (Dermott, Arkansas), formerly listed on the National Register of Historic Places in Chicot County
- Walker House (Fayetteville, Arkansas)
- Walker Homestead Historic District, Garner, Arkansas
- Thomas Walker House, Hardy, Arkansas
- Evelyn Gill Walker House, in Paris, Arkansas
- Otha Walker Homestead, West Point, Arkansas
- Walker House, Oakland, California, opened by Yvette Flunder for services to people affected by HIV/AIDS
- Walker Ranch Historic District, Boulder, Colorado
- Armstrong-Walker House, Middletown, Delaware
- R. Walker Barn, Newark, Delaware
- Galloway-Walker House, Newport, Delaware
- Walker's Mill and Walker's Bank, Wilmington, Delaware
- Horace Walker House, St. Augustine, Florida,. Johns County
- Harris-Pearson-Walker House, Augusta, Georgia, listed on the NRHP in Richmond County
- Walker-Peters-Langdon House, Columbus, Georgia, listed on the NRHP in Muscogee County
- Almand-O'Kelley-Walker House, Conyers, Georgia
- H. Alexander Walker Residence, Honolulu, Hawaii, on Oahu
- Madame C. J. Walker Building, Indianapolis, Indiana
- James Walker House, Anchorage, Kentucky, listed on the NRHP in Anchorage
- E. W. Walker House, Hopkinsville, Kentucky, listed on the NRHP in Christian County
- Walker House (Lancaster, Kentucky)
- Hankla-Walker House, Perryville, Kentucky, listed on the NRHP in Boyle County
- William Walker House, Richmond, Kentucky, listed on the NRHP in Madison County
- Walker House (Richmond, Kentucky), listed on the National Register of Historic Places in Madison County
- Morgan Walker House, in Alexandria, Louisiana, listed on the NRHP in Rapides Parish
- Walker House (New Orleans, Louisiana), listed on the National Register of Historic Places in Orleans Parish
- Walker Memorial Hall, Bridgton, Maine
- Walker Memorial Library, Westbrook, Maine
- Walker-Collis House, Belchertown, Massachusetts
- Harding House-Walker Missionary Home, Newton, Massachusetts
- Walker Home for Missionary Children, Newton, Massachusetts
- Bogle-Walker House, Sudbury, Massachusetts
- Peter Walker House, Taunton, Massachusetts
- Walker Tavern, Cambridge Junction, Michigan
- Franklin H. Walker House, Detroit, Michigan
- Miller-Walker House, Saline, Michigan
- Walker and Valentine House, Rushford, Minnesota, listed on the NRHP in Fillmore County
- Walker-Critz House, Starkville, Mississippi, listed on the NRHP in Oktibbeha County
- Walker-Woodward-Schaffer House, Palmyra, Missouri
- Walker House (Kalispell, Montana), listed on the NRHP in Flathead County
- Upham-Walker House, Concord, New Hampshire
- Walker-Combs-Hartshorne Farmstead, Freehold, New Jersey
- Walker House (Garrison, New York)
- Gifford-Walker Farm, North Bergen, New York
- Walker Cottage, Saranac Lake (Harrietstown), New York
- Walker's Inn, Andrews, North Carolina
- Holloway-Walker Dollarhite House, Bethel Hill, North Carolina
- T. J. Walker Historic District, Fort Ransom, North Dakota
- Christopher C. Walker House and Farm, New Madison, Ohio
- William Walker, Jr., House, Upper Sandusky, Ohio, listed on the NRHP in Wyandot County
- Walker House (Shawnee, Oklahoma), listed on the National Register of Historic Places in Pottawatomie County
- John P. Walker House, Ashland, Oregon, listed on the NRHP in Jackson County
- Walker-Ewing Log House, Oakdale, Pennsylvania
- Joseph Walker House, Tredyffrin Township, Pennsylvania
- Phillip Walker House, East Providence, Rhode Island
- Colding-Walker House, Appleton, South Carolina
- Albion Walker Chalkrock House, Tabor, South Dakota
- James Buchanan Walker House, Centerville, Tennessee
- Walker Sisters Place, a.k.a. King-Walker Place, Gatlinburg, Tennessee
- Thomas J. Walker House, Knoxville, Tennessee
- Oliphant-Walker House, Austin, Texas
- James Walker Log House, Brenham, Texas
- J. A. Walker House and R. B. Rogers House, Brownwood, Texas, listed on the NRHP in Brown County
- Howard Walker House, Lufkin, Texas, listed on the NRHP in Angelina County
- Walker Ranch (San Antonio, Texas), listed on the NRHP in Bexar County
- Walker House (Shoreacres, Texas), listed on the NRHP in Harris County
- Samuel D. Walker House, Park City, Utah
- Maggie Lena Walker House, National Historic Site, Richmond, Virginia, listed on the NRHP
- Scott-Walker House, Saltville, Virginia
- Walker House (Warren, Virginia)
- Harry B. Walker House, Milwaukee, Wisconsin, listed on the NRHP in Milwaukee County
- Walker House (Mineral Point, Wisconsin), an inn and restaurant
- Kneeland-Walker House, Wauwatosa, Wisconsin

== See also ==
- Walker Hall (disambiguation)
- Walker Building (disambiguation)
- Walker (disambiguation)
