= George F. West =

American business magnate

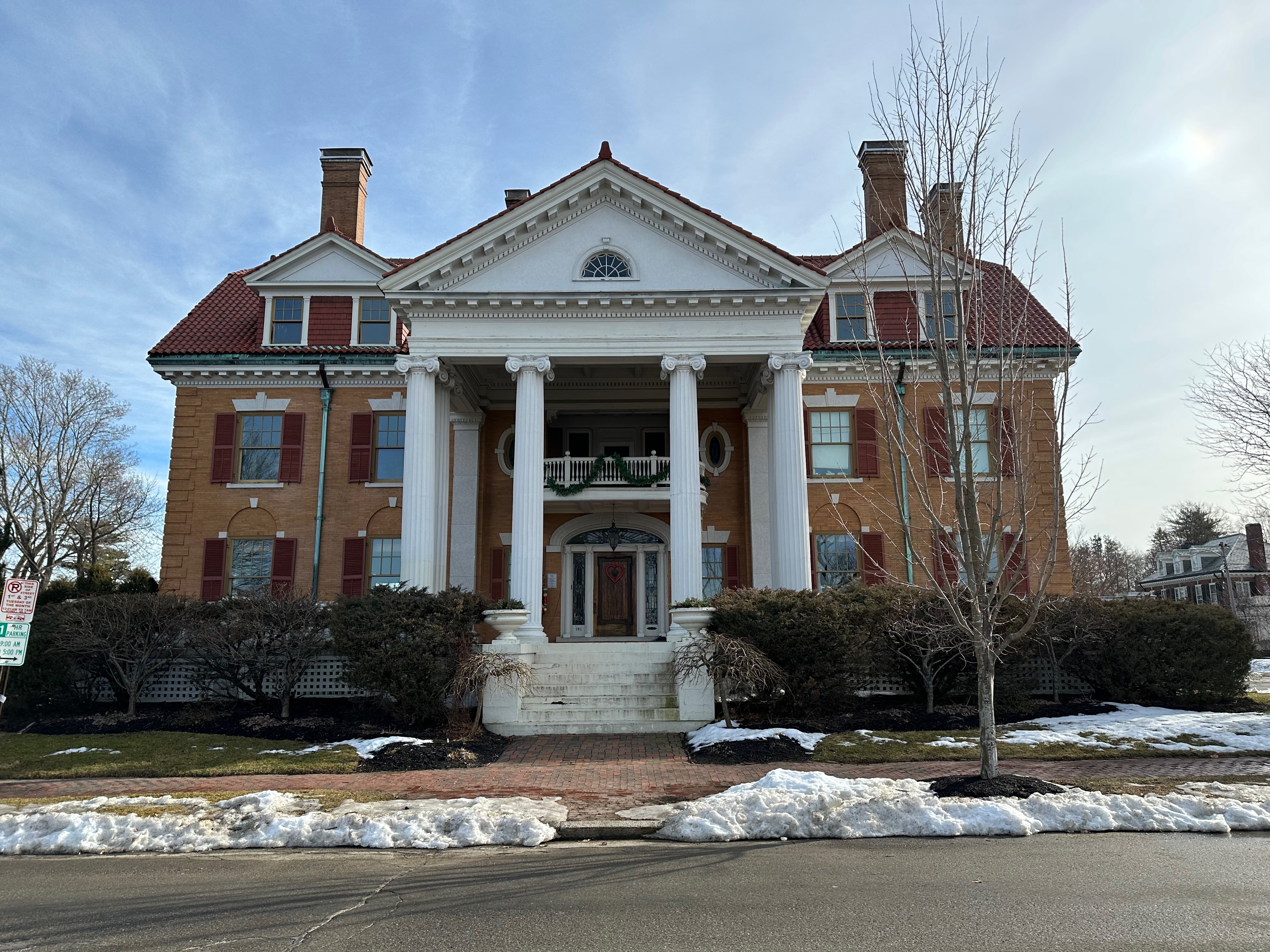
West Mansion, completed in 1911, is part of the Western Promenade Historic District.

George Fletcher West (August 20, 1862 – July 11, 1943) was an American business magnate. Born in Somerville, Massachusetts to former Union general George Warren West, he attended Somerville schools before enrolling at Harvard University. He later settled in Portland, Maine. He served in leadership positions in a number of business and philanthropic organizations, including the Maine State Board of Trade, Maine Chamber of Commerce, and the Portland YMCA.

West commissioned architect Frederick A. Tompson to build West Mansion on the Western Promenade. It cost $100,000, a shocking amount for the period.

Disabled for the final eight years of his life, West died on July 11, 1943 at his home. He was buried at Portland's Evergreen Cemetery.
