= Walker Hall =

Walker Hall, or variants thereof, may refer to:

== United States ==
Note these are listed on the National Register of Historic Places or are contributing properties.

- Walker Hall (Gainesville, Florida)
- Walker Memorial Hall, Bridgton, Maine, listed on the NRHP in Cumberland County, Maine
- Walker Hall (Spartanburg, South Carolina), listed on the NRHP in Spartanburg County, South Carolina

== See also ==
- Walker Building (disambiguation)
- Walker House (disambiguation)
