= Adam P. Leighton =

American politician (1851–1922)

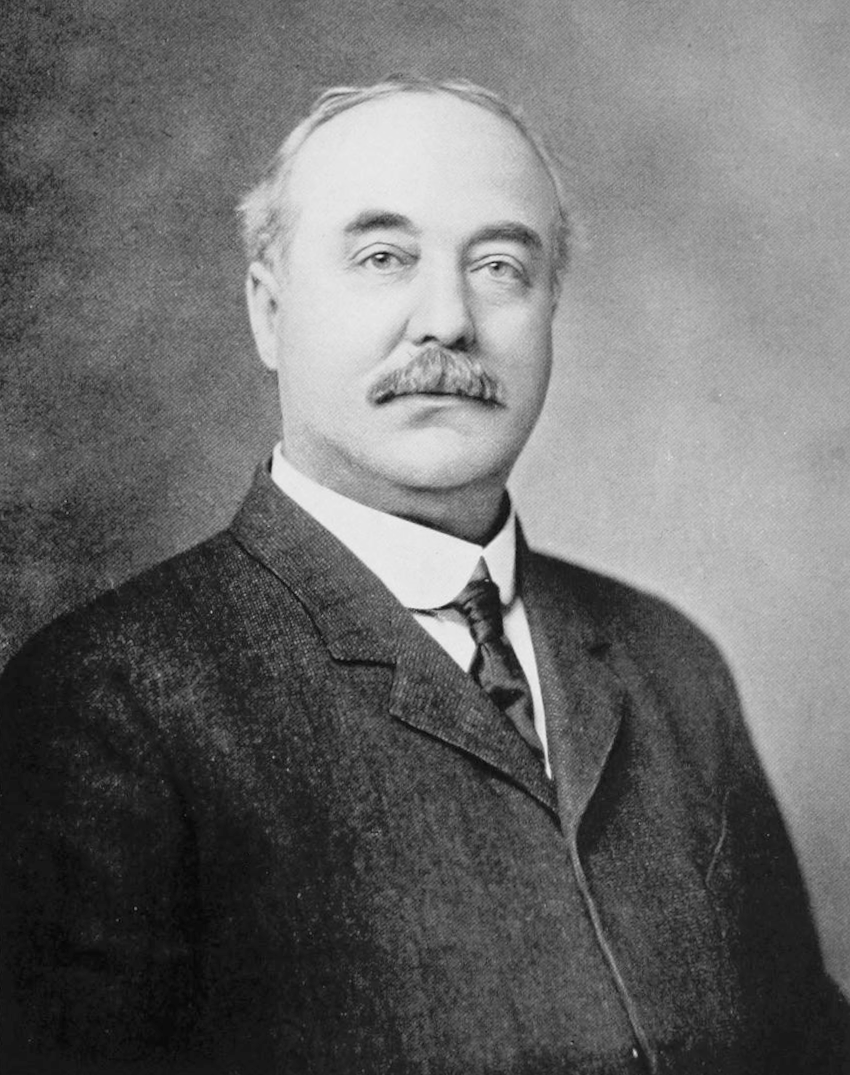
Adam Phillips Leighton, pictured around 1909

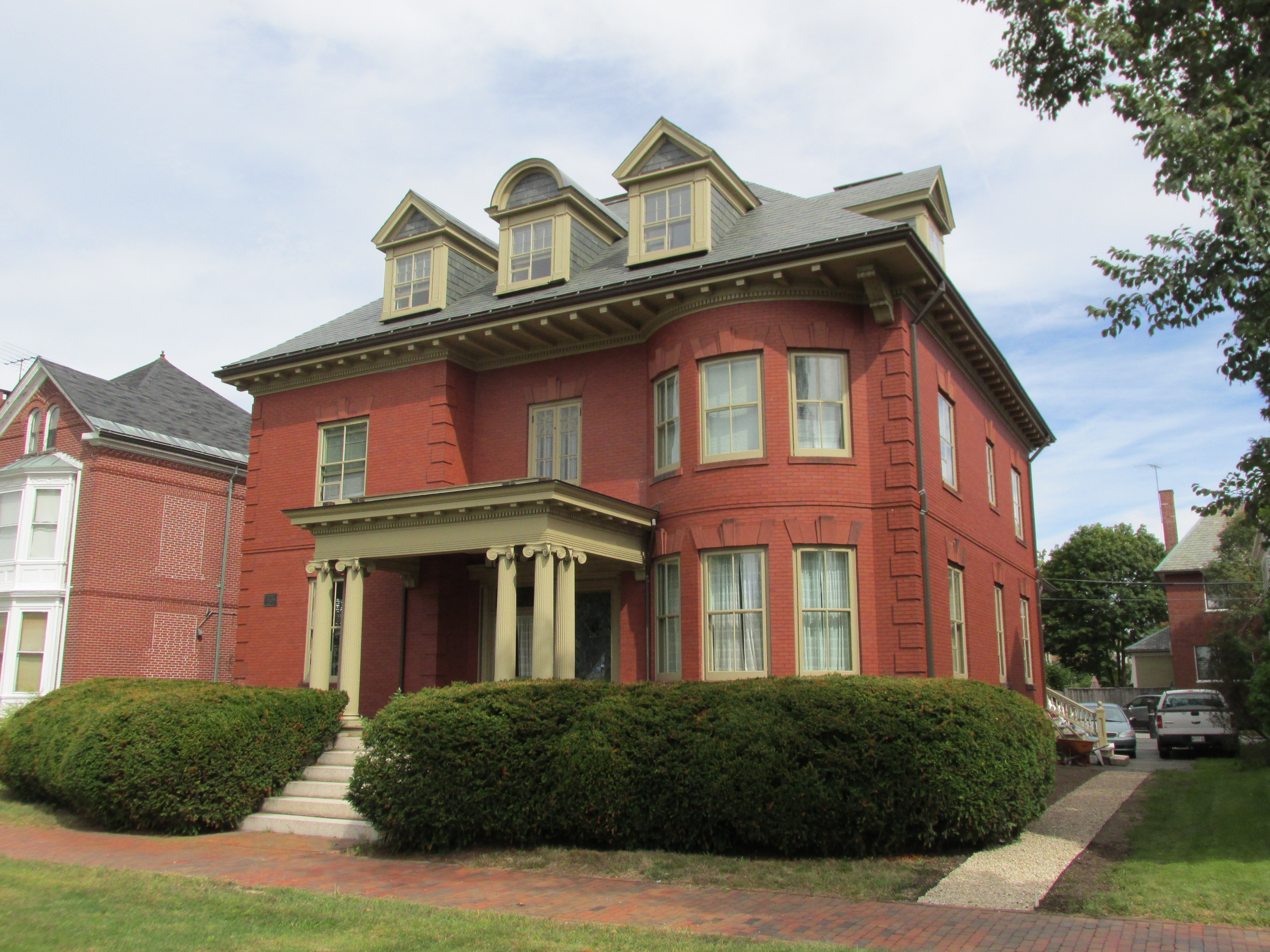
The Adam P. Leighton House

Adam Phillips Leighton (April 6, 1851 – August 24, 1922) was an American politician from Maine. He served as Mayor of Portland from 1908 to 1909. A resident of the West End, his historic home—now known as the Adam P. Leighton House—is located at 261 Western Promenade and is located on the National Register of Historic Places.

Leighton was a businessperson and is considered the "father of the picture post card industry".

Leighton was born in April 1851 on a farm in West Falmouth, Maine, and moved with his family to Portland in 1861. He attended local public schools before graduating from Westbrook Seminary. In 1867, at the age of 16, Leighton began work as a clerk with Chisholm Brothers Publishing, which was then owned by future paper magnate Hugh J. Chisholm. He married his wife, Isadore M. Butler, on April 30, 1873. The Leighton family had four children. His youngest, Adam Phillips Leighton Jr., made his career as a doctor.

As Chisholm Brothers expanded and acquired news agency privileges on the Grand Trunk Railway, Leighton advanced in the company. He was placed in charge of the companies business at the Grand Trunk Railway Station. He became vice-president of that operation and pioneered the practice of placing newspapers and magazines on railroad cars. He later became involved in the manufacture of chewing gum.

A staunch Republican, Leighton's time in elected office began in 1891, when he was elected to the Portland City Council. He was re-elected twice to the City Council, served in 1894 as Street Commissioner and to two terms as alderman (1896–1897). In 1908, Leighton defeated Democrat Nathan Clifford for the office of mayor. Six weeks into his first term, Portland City Hall was destroyed in a fire. Leighton chaired a commission to build a new municipal government structure, which was completed in 1911 at the cost of $1,000,000. He unsuccessfully sought to build the new City Hall in Lincoln Park, which was a short distance from the original city hall building. He was easily re-elected for a second term and was replaced in 1909 by Charles A. Strout. Despite an anti-prohibition governor and state legislature, Leighton successfully stopped measures to weaken Maine longtime prohibition on the consumption of alcohol.

In 1904, he established A. P. Leighton Company, which became Hugh C. Leighton Company (founded by his son) two years later.

He was a member of the Knights of Pythias and Knights Templar.

He died at his home in Portland on August 24, 1922, and was buried at Evergreen Cemetery.
