= John M. Brown (disambiguation) =

John M. Brown (1817–1852) was an American bishop in the African Methodist Episcopal church. John M. Brown may also refer to:

- John M. Brown III (fl. 1960s–2000s), United States Army general
- John Macmillan Brown (1845–1935), Scottish-New Zealand academic, administrator and promoter of education for women
- Johnny Mack Brown (1904–1974), American film actor and college football player
- John Marshall Brown (1838–1907), American commissioned officer during the American Civil War
- John Mason Brown (1900–1969), American literary critic
- Sir John McLeavy Brown (1835–1926), British lawyer and diplomat

== See also ==
- John Martin Ainley Brown (1928–2005), New Zealand Test match umpire
- John Moulder-Brown (born 1953), English actor
