= Adam P. Leighton House =

Historic house in Maine, United States

- U.S. National Register of Historic Places
- U.S. Historic district – Contributing property
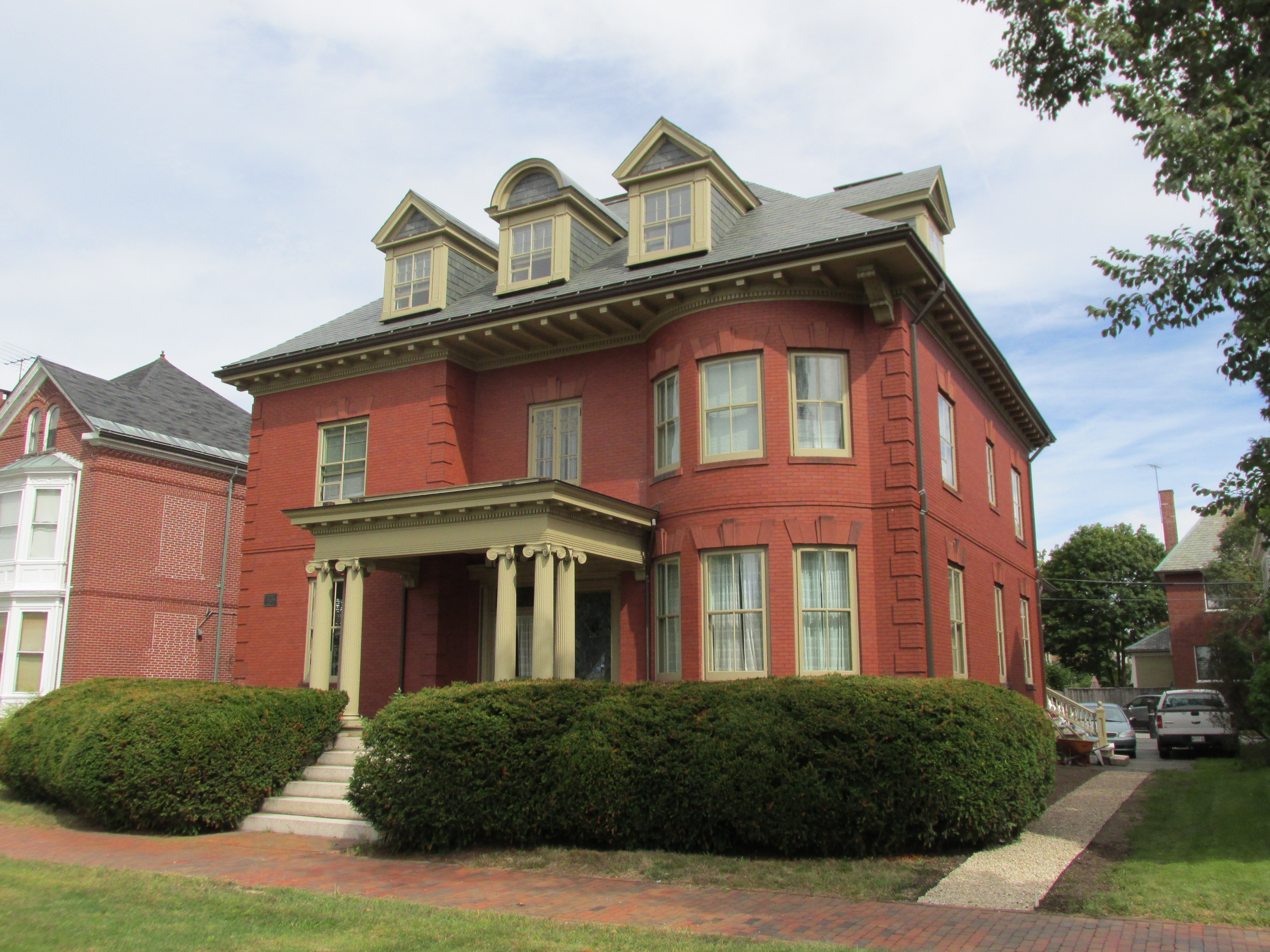
- Adam P. Leighton House

- Location within Maine Location within the United States
- Location: 261 Western Promenade, Portland, Maine
- Coordinates: 43°39′4″N 70°16′34″W
- Area: 0.3 acres (0.12 ha)
- Built: 1902-03
- Architect: Frederick A. Tompson
- Architectural style: Colonial Revival
- Part of: Western Promenade Historic District (ID84001363)
- NRHP reference No.: 82000746

Significant dates
- Added to NRHP: September 29, 1982
- Designated CP: February 16, 1984

The Adam P. Leighton House is an historic house at 261 Western Promenade in Portland, Maine. Built in 1903, it is a fine local example of Colonial Revival architecture, and is further prominent as home to Adam P. Leighton, who was "considered the father of the American postcard industry", and served as the Mayor of Portland from 1908 to 1909. The house was listed on the National Register of Historic Places in 1982.

== Description and history ==
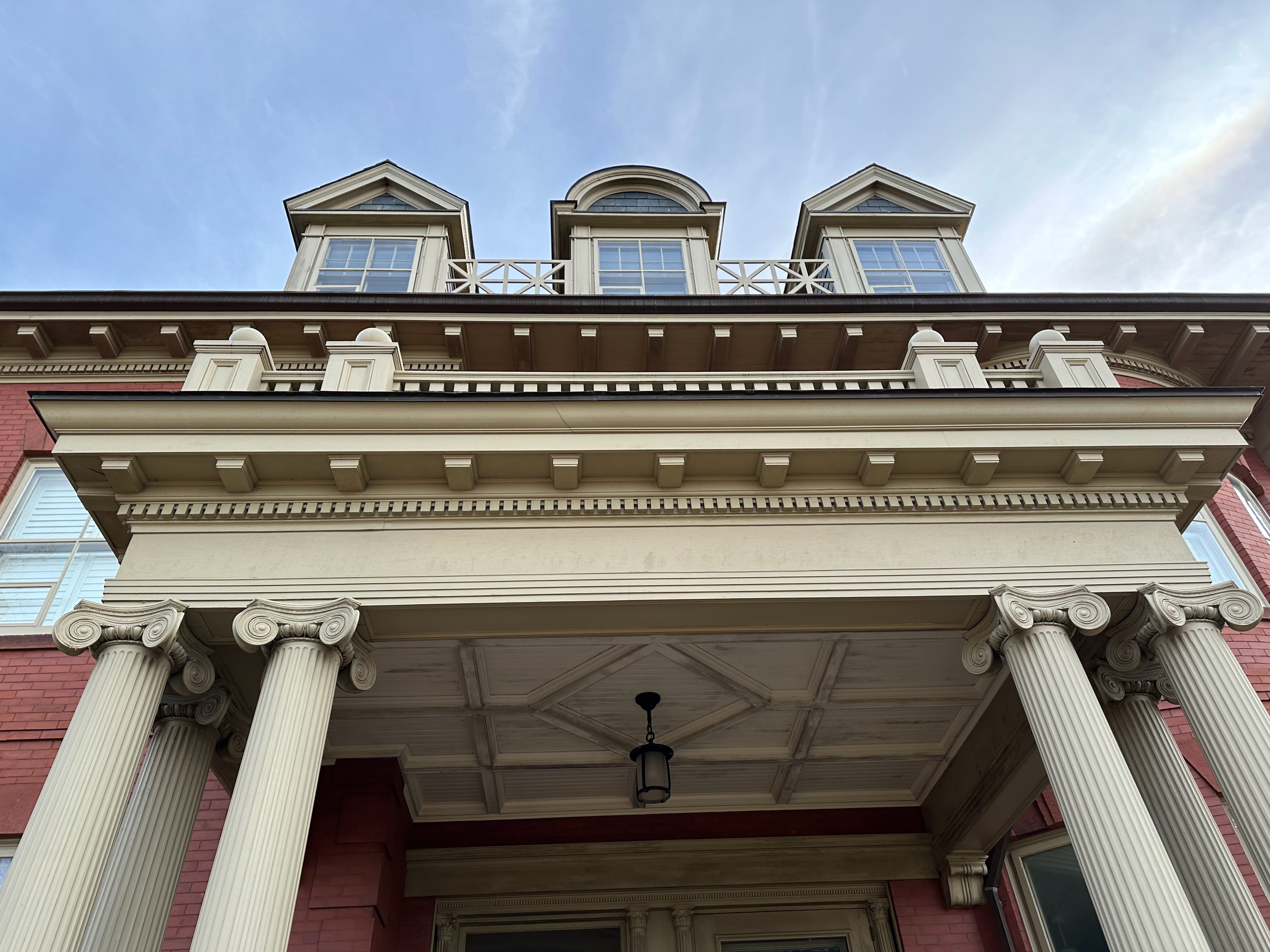
Portico detail

The Leighton House is located in Portland's West End, near the northern end of the Western Promenade, a public park. It is set overlooking the park on the east side, between West and Pine Streets. It is a 2 1/2-story brick building, with a dormered hip roof with bracketed eaves. The front facade is three bays wide, with an asymmetrical arrangement. The left bays are in a rectangular projection with single sash windows, and the right bays form a rounded projection with three window bays on each level. The entrance is at the center, sheltered by a portico supported by modified Doric columns. Corners are laid in brick that emulates quoining, and the windows have keystoned lintels.

The house was built in 1902–03, to a design by local architect Frederick A. Tompson. Adam P. Leighton, for whom it was built, had made a fortune publishing "view books" (books containing lithographs), and then individual half-toned photographs, which were the first postcards. By the time this house was built, Leighton was a prominent local businessman, serving on bank boards and in elective offices. He was Portland's mayor for one term, 1908–09.

== See also ==
- National Register of Historic Places listings in Portland, Maine
- Western Promenade Historic District
