= West Mansion =

House in Portland, Maine, United States

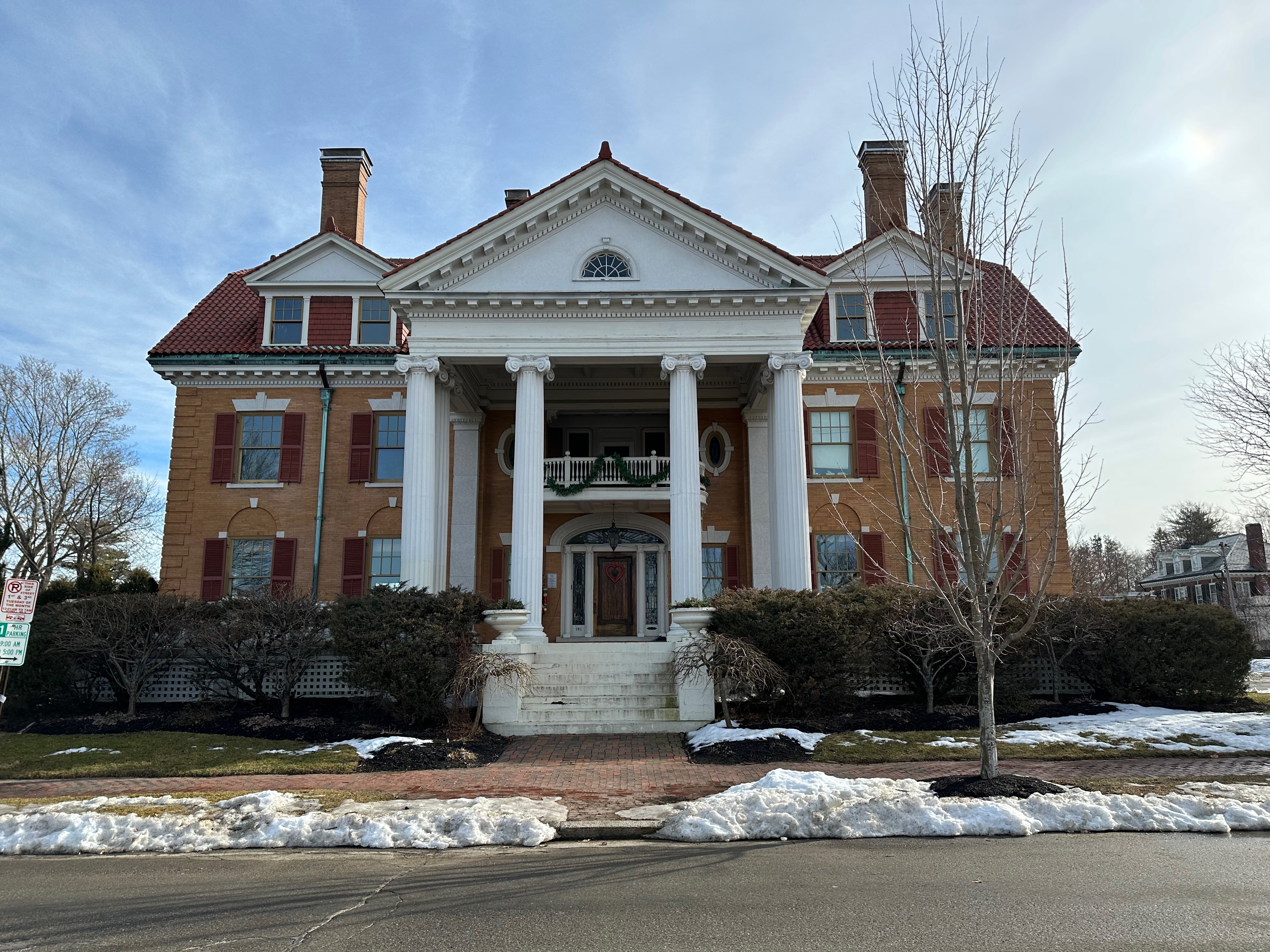
- The building in 2024
- Interactive map of the West Mansion area

General information
- Architectural style: Georgian Revival
- Location: 181 Western Promenade
- Coordinates: 43.6485°N 70.2755°W
- Demolished: 1911 (115 years ago)
- Owner: George F. West

Technical details
- Floor count: 3

Design and construction
- Architect: Frederick A. Tompson

West Mansion is a mansion in the West End of Portland, Maine, United States. Completed in 1911, to a design by noted architect Frederick A. Tompson, the mansion's first owner was George F. West, for whom it is named. Located on Bramhall Hill, at the intersection of Western Promenade and Carroll Street, the building is regarded as a Portland landmark, alongside the Portland Observatory on Munjoy Hill and Victoria Mansion in the downtown area. Greater Portland Landmarks describes the home as "palatial" in its scale and architectural style.

One of the home's most noted features are the four 30-foot (9.1 m)-tall Ionic columns supporting its portico. The home has seventeen rooms (including nine bedrooms) in its 13,764 square feet (1,278.7 m^{2}). It has ten fireplaces.

In 2022, the home was listed for sale at $2.55 million.

== Portico detail ==
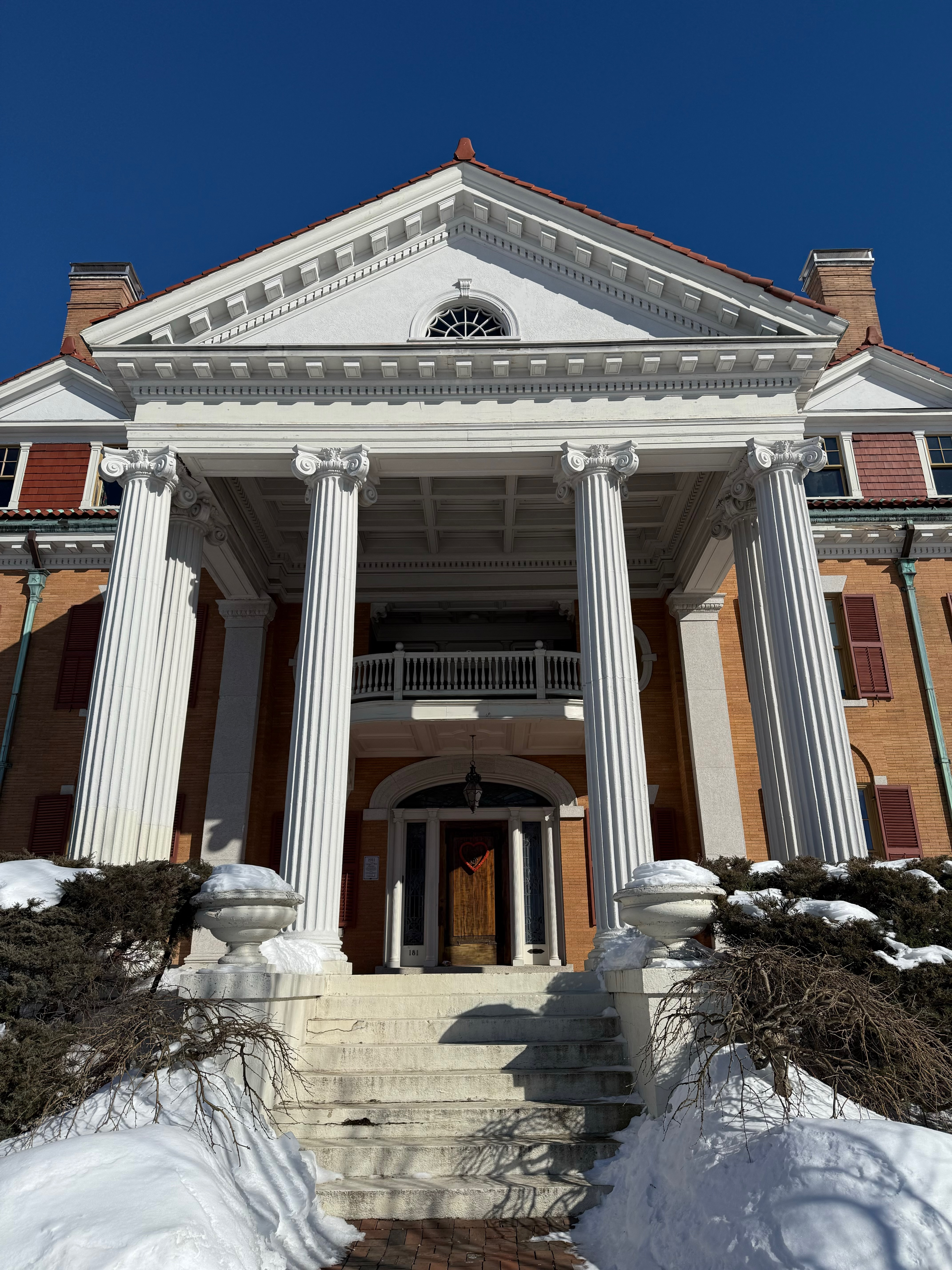

== See also ==
- Western Promenade Historic District
