= Western Promenade Historic District =

Historic district in Maine, United States

- U.S. National Register of Historic Places
- U.S. Historic district
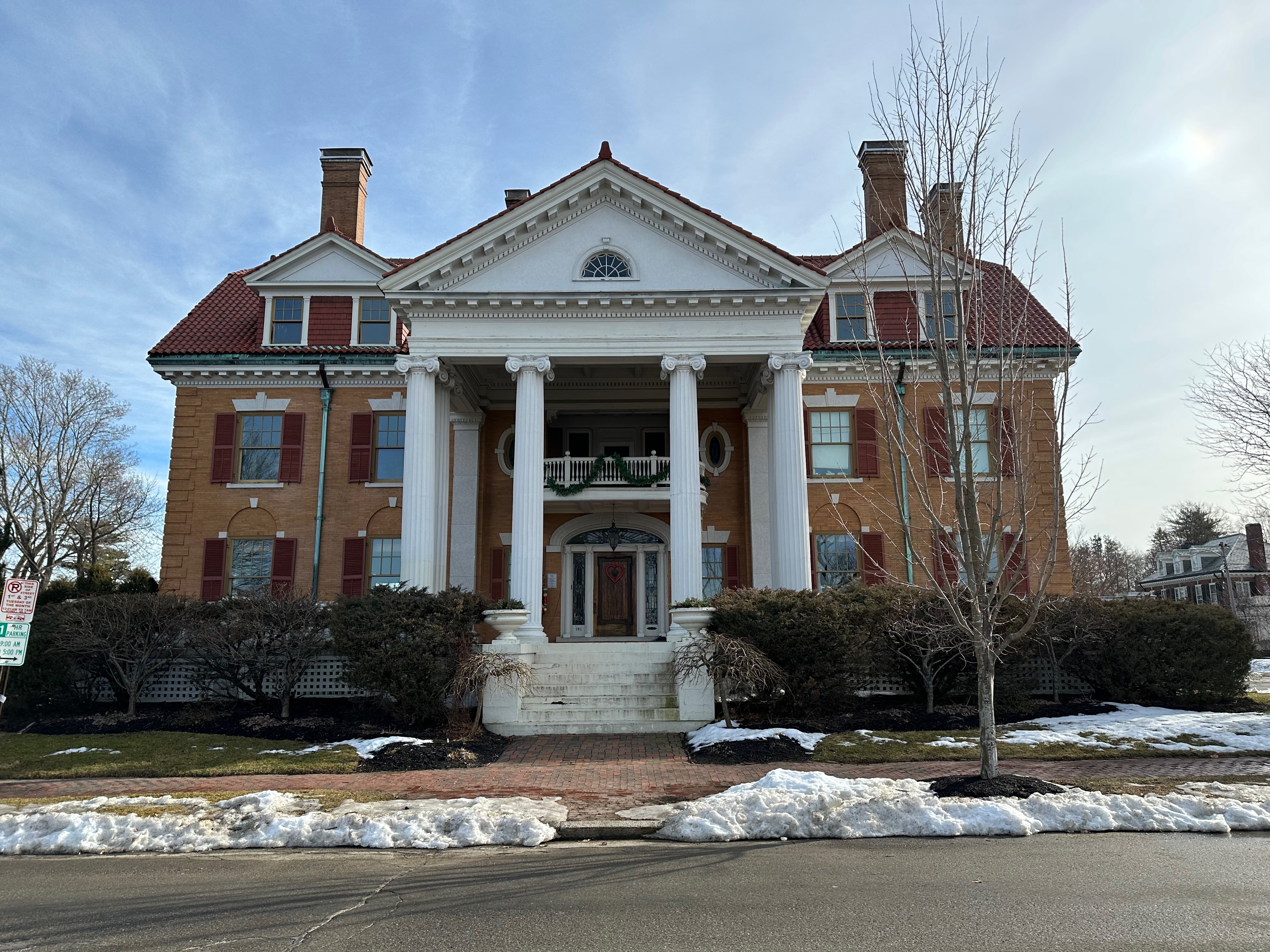
- West Mansion on the Western Promenade

- Location within Maine Location within the United States
- Location: Roughly bounded by Western Promenade and Bramhall, Brackett
- Coordinates: 43°38′54″N 70°16′19″W
- Area: 124 acres (50 ha)
- Architectural style: Colonial, Late Victorian
- NRHP reference No.: 84001363
- Added to NRHP: February 16, 1984

The Western Promenade Historic District encompasses a late 19th-and early 20th-century neighborhood in the West End of Portland, Maine. This area of architecturally distinctive homes was home to three of the city's most prominent architects: Francis H. Fassett, John Calvin Stevens, and Frederick A. Tompson, and was Portland's most fashionable neighborhood in the late 19th century. The district was listed on the National Register of Historic Places in 1984.

== Description and history ==
Prior to about 1850, much of Portland's development took place in the central portion of the Portland peninsula, whose western end was somewhat swampy. Most of the southwestern portion of the peninsula, between Danforth and Congress Streets, was owned by J. B. Brown, who in the mid-1850s built a large mansion house (called "Bramhall"). The city had, in 1836, acquired some land at the western escarpment, and established the Western Promenade, a public park. The Western Cemetery acreage had been purchased from the heirs of William Vaughan in 1829 and opened as the new municipal cemetery in 1830. All of its family plots had been sold by 1852. In the 1860s, the city began to grow westward, and Brown platted out a road network and began selling off building lots, draining and filling the swampy areas.

Prominent among the purchasers of land in the area was Francis H. Fassett, the city's leading architect of the second half of the 19th century. His own home stands at 117–119 Pine Street, and he is credited with a significant number of designs in the neighborhood. Fassett was a mentor to John Calvin Stevens, who lived on Bowdoin Street in the West End. His house is a notable early example of the Shingle style, which Stevens had a major role in promoting, and his designs are also found throughout the area.

The historic district is bounded on the west by the Western Promenade, the north by Bramhall and Brackett Streets, on the south by Danforth Street, and the east by a ragged line that roughly includes Clark, Cushman, and Emery Streets. There are 420 buildings in the district, representing a diversity of architectural styles which were popular between 1850 and 1920. There are architect-designed examples of Second Empire, Italianate, Queen Anne, Colonial Revival, and Shingle styles, with a notable row of houses lining the Western Promenade. Among those is the Adam P. Leighton House, an Italianate mansion designed by Frederick A. Tompson for Adam Leighton, a Portland businessman and mayor who is credited with inventing the postcard.

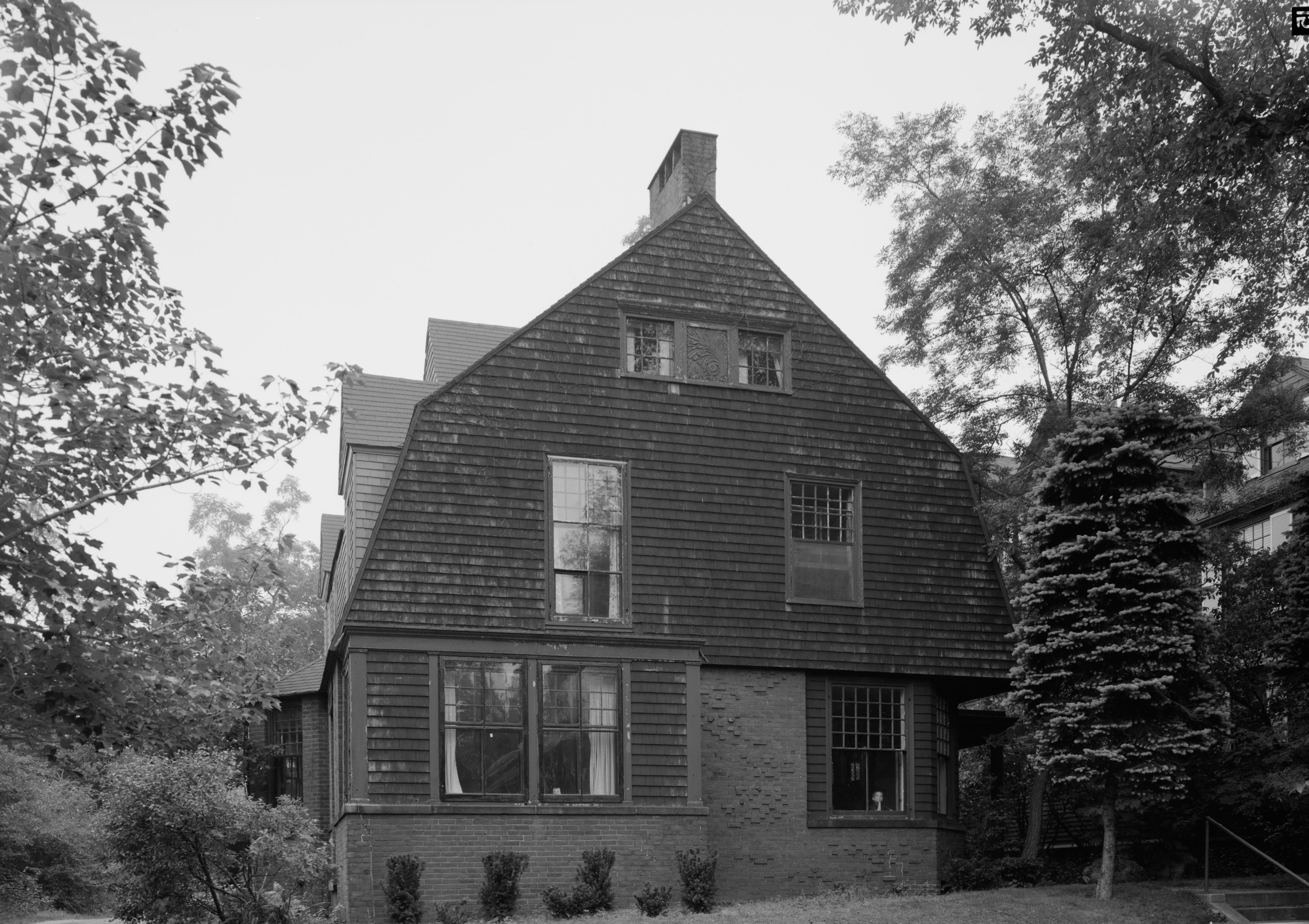
John Calvin Stevens House.

== See also ==
- National Register of Historic Places listings in Portland, Maine
