= Marcy's Diner =

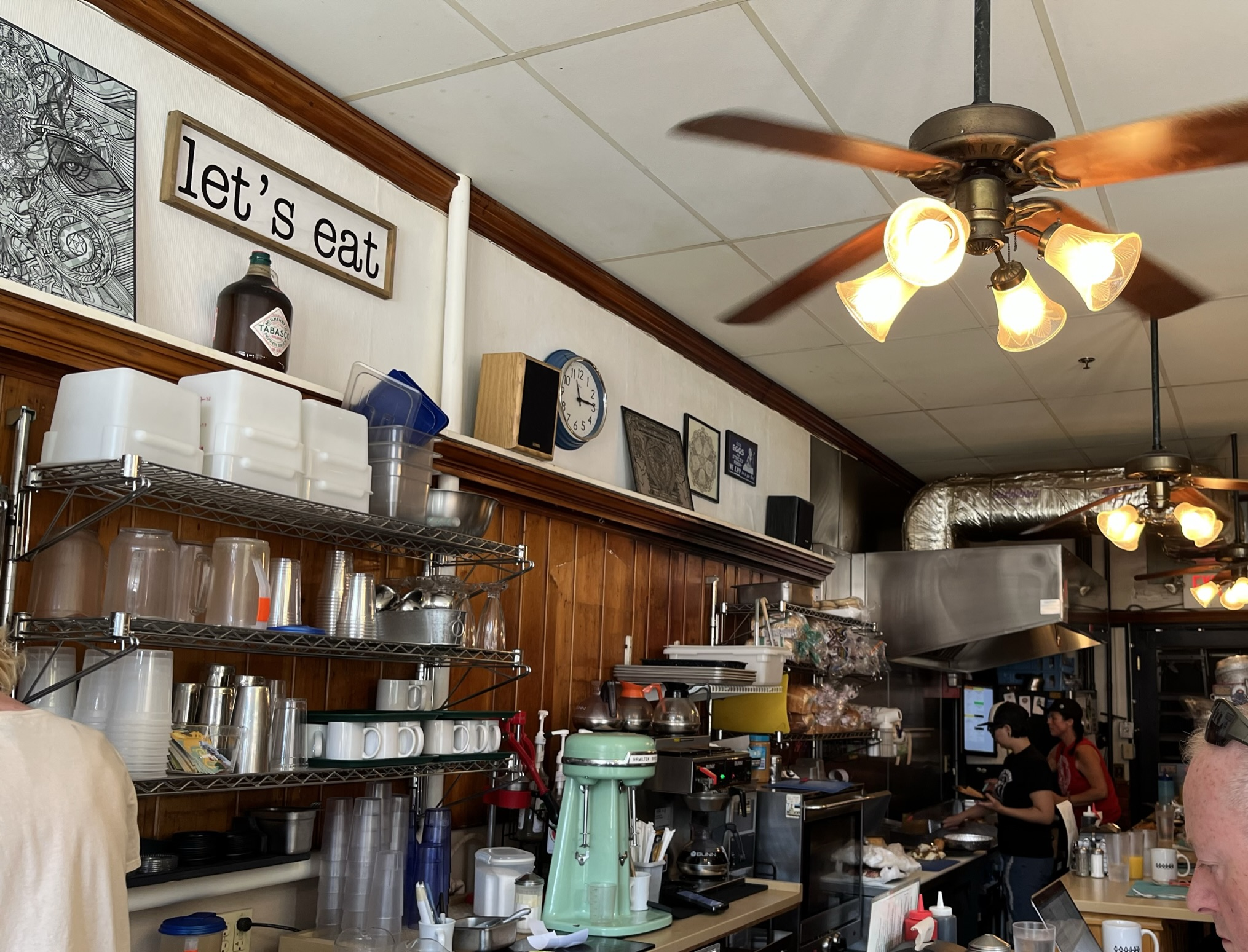
- The diner in 2022

- Location within Maine

Restaurant information
- Established: 1941
- Owners: Mandy Lacourse (since January 2019)
- Previous owners: Darla Neugebauer (2011–2019)
- Food type: Breakfast and lunch
- Dress code: Casual
- Location: Everett Chambers; 47 Oak Street, Portland, Cumberland County, Maine, 04101
- Coordinates: 43.6550°N 70.2613°W
- Seating capacity: 32 (ten counter stools, 22 in five booths)
- Reservations: No

Marcy's Diner is a diner in Portland, Maine. It made international headlines in 2015 after a spat between then-cook-owner Darla Neugebauer and a patron over the latter's screaming child.

Located in the Everett Chambers building, it is open five days a week: Wednesday to Sunday, 7.00am to 1.00pm.

== History ==
The first of the two counters. Mandy Lacourse (right) became the owner of the diner in 2019

Known in its early days as Your Host Café, then in the 1960s as Lou’s, and later as Mike’s, it became Marcy's Diner in 1989. Marcy Litman, now resident in St. Petersburg, Florida, ran the business for ten years, selling it in 1999 to Kevin and Heather Smith. It was sold again two years later, to Murray and Joely Sparks. After getting to know Murray's mother, Lois, while working at the now-defunct Paul's Food Center, Darla Neugebauer — then working at Portland's Holiday Inn by the Bay — learned that the Sparkses were looking to sell the diner because the recent birth of their child meant they could no longer afford the time it needed. Lois Sparks was killed in an automobile accident in 2012, a year after the Neugebauers purchased the diner.

Co-owner Doug Neugebauer died on March 10, 2018.

In January 2019, Mandy Lacourse took the business over from Neugebauer. Lacourse was a server at the diner between 1997 and mid-2018. The diner celebrated its thirtieth anniversary under Marcy's name on March 8, 2019.

== Babygate ==
The diner made international news in 2015 after then-owner Darla Neugebauer's confrontation with Tara Carson, the mother of a 21-month-old child who was screaming "for forty minutes" after her pancakes were kept out of her reach by her parents during their July 18 visit. Neugebauer yelled "That needs to stop!" and pointed at the child. "I think what everyone is forgetting, it’s my [diner], my rules,” Neugebauer's said shortly after the incident. This was one of the phrases that made it onto a T-shirt now sold in the diner. “If you don’t want to play by the rules, I’ll happily call Portland PD to escort your (expletive) out. If it seems like I’m getting a little pissed off, it’s because I am."

“I chose to yell at the kid. It made her shut up, which made me happy, made my staff happy, made the other 75 people in the restaurant happy,” said Neugebauer, a native of Madison, Maine. “I may have used poor judgement, but I wouldn’t say I was sorry, because it stopped.”

Carson's side of the story was posted on the website of the Washington Post.

Since the controversy, business at the diner has increased exponentially, despite the average rating of reviews being lowered by people who side with Carson. “We’ve gone from three cases of bacon a week to eight,” said Neugebauer a month after the incident. A year later, their egg usage had increased from three cases a week to "three cases on a Sunday." Neugebauer added: "Babygate was very good for Marcy's. I have a new grill with four working handles. The old one only had one!"

“I’ve been here two and half years,” said Gillian Sinnott, one of the waitstaff at the time. “It feels likes it’s doubled since I’ve been here. I used to work two shifts on my own, and I can’t serve by myself any day of the week now.” They also employed a dedicated host for lunchtimes, which is something they had never previously needed. There was a two-hour wait on Saturday and Sunday mornings for a long period thereafter.
