= J.B. Brown Memorial Block =

- J. B. Brown Memorial Block
- U.S. National Register of Historic Places
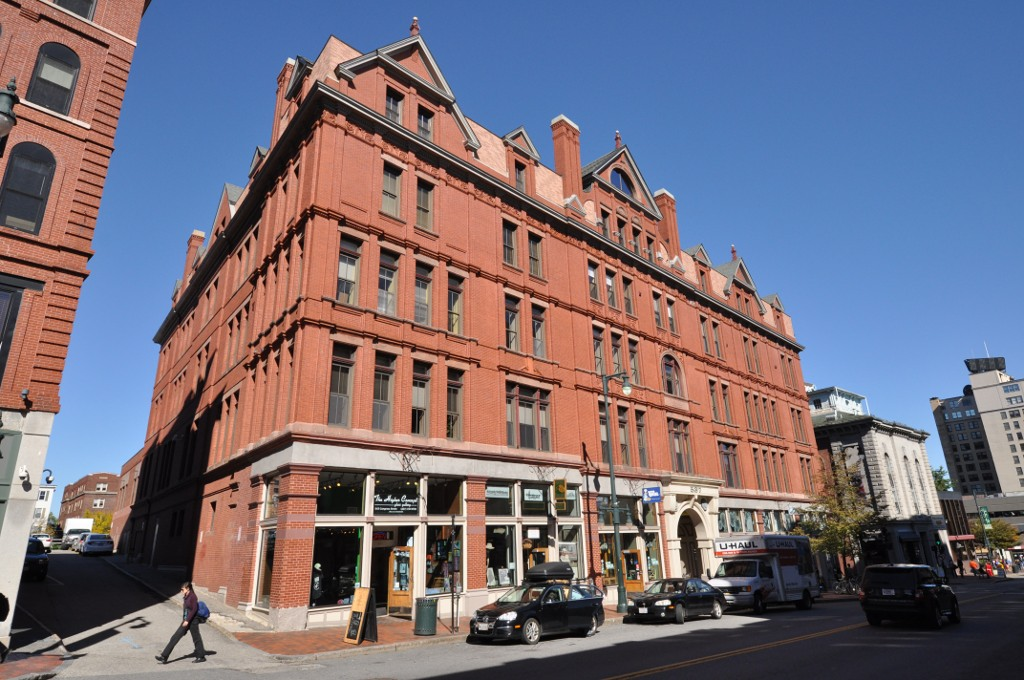

- Location within Maine Location within the United States
- Location: Congress and Casco Sts., Portland, Maine
- Coordinates: 43°39′21″N 70°15′42″W
- Area: 1 acre (0.40 ha)
- Built: 1883
- Architect: John Calvin Stevens
- Architectural style: Queen Anne
- NRHP reference No.: 78000167
- Added to NRHP: May 23, 1978

The J.B. Brown Memorial Block (also known as the John B. Brown Building) is a historic commercial building at Congress and Casco Streets in downtown Portland, Maine. Built in 1883 to a design by John Calvin Stevens, it is one of the city's few examples of Queen Anne Victorian commercial architecture. It is named in honor of John Bundy Brown, founder in 1855 of the Portland Sugar Company. Brown's signature is visible in the cement block above the main entrance to the building.

The building was listed on the National Register of Historic Places in 1978.

== Description and history ==
The Brown Memorial Block stands on the northwest side of Congress Street, the principal road through the city's downtown area, at the western corner with Casco Street. It is a large 4-1/2 story masonry structure, built primarily out of brick, occupying about 2/3 of the block between Casco and Oak Streets. Its main facade is 120 feet (37 m) long, with four store fronts which are slightly stepped due to the sloping lot. Its window bays are articulated by brick pilasters, and are set in groups of varying sizes. Near the center of the facade is the main entrance, recessed behind a stone arch; the bays above this entrance include a round-arch window on the third floor, and it is capped by one of two large gabled projections from the hipped roof, and flanked by a pair decoratively-topped chimneys. The hip roof is obscured by a wall, added in the mid-20th century, which gives the roof a mansard appears; it was added to minimize snow falling from the roof onto the sidewalk below. The interior has for the most part been covered over by reversible modern finishes.

The building was designed by John Calvin Stevens, then already a well-known Portland architect, and was built in 1883. John B. Brown, in whose honor it is named, founded the Portland Sugar Company in 1855, and in 1868 built the Falmouth Hotel, on Middle Street, which was a center of the city's social activities for half a century.

The J.B. Brown Building was occupied between 1884 and 1977 by the Rines Brothers department store. It closed after the death of its president Louis E. Weiner.

== See also ==
- National Register of Historic Places listings in Portland, Maine
