= Hugh C. Leighton Company =

American publisher

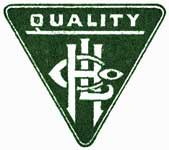
- Logo of Hugh C. Leighton Company
- Founded: 1906 (120 years ago)
- Founder: Hugh Chisholm Leighton
- Defunct: 1909 (117 years ago)
- Country of origin: United States
- Headquarters location: Plum Street, Portland, Maine
- Publication types: Postcards

Hugh C. Leighton Company was a publishing company based in Portland, Maine, United States, in operation between 1906 and 1909. It was noted for its printing and publishing of postcards, predominantly of scenes around New England.

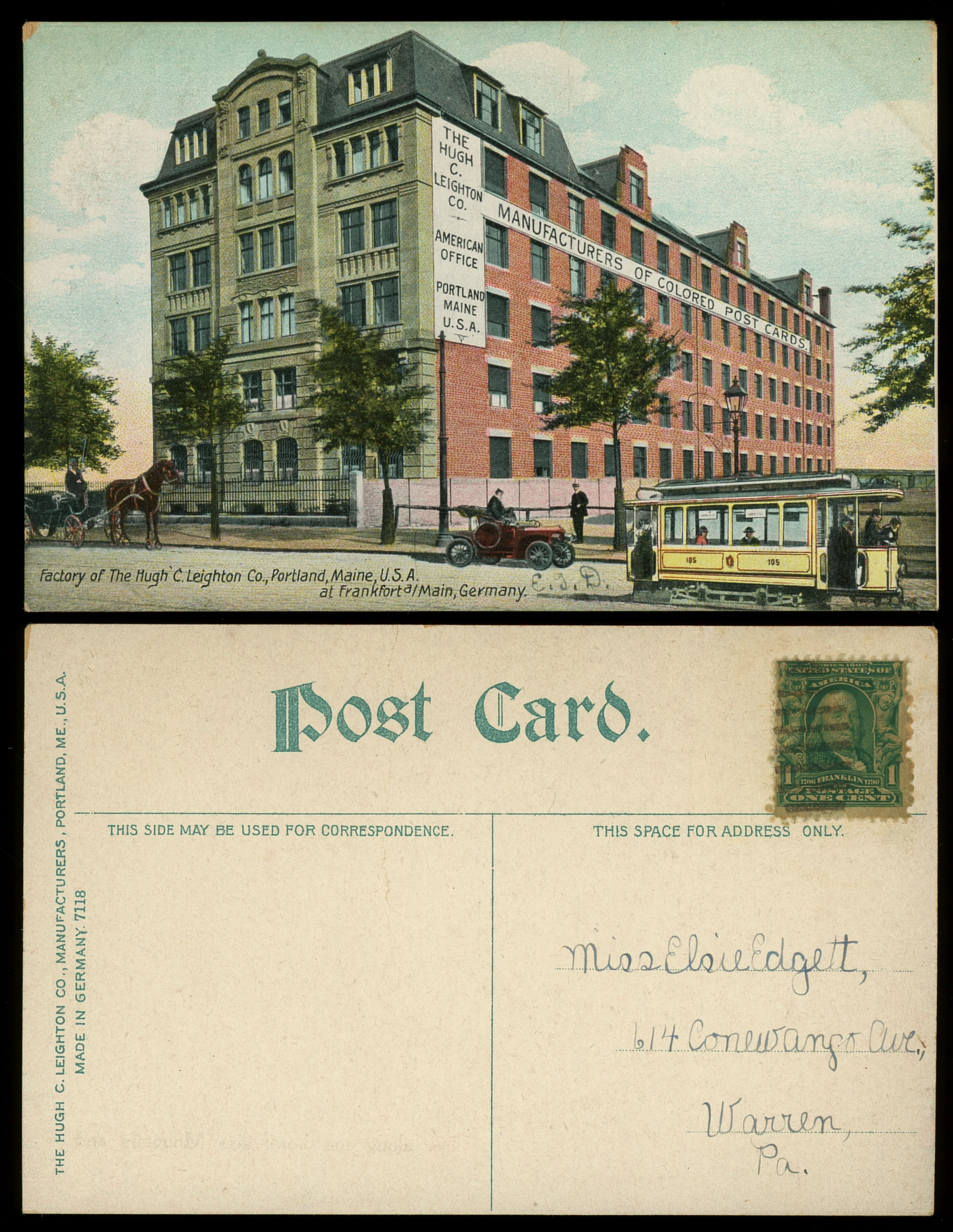
The printing facility of Hugh C. Leighton Company in Frankfurt, Germany, pictured around 1910.

The company was originally known as A. P. Leighton Company between 1904 and 1906, owned by Adam Phillips Leighton. His son, Hugh Chisholm, formed the new company, which was based on the now-demolished Plum Street. (Plum Street connected Fore Street and Middle Street between Exchange Street and Union Street.)

Hugh C. Leighton Company produced cards in four main styles: halftone lithography, continuous-tone lithography, collotype and hand-colored. Some cards also used the gravure process.

Some cards were printed in the United States, but most were done in Frankfurt, Germany.

Hugh C. Leighton Company merged with Scottish company Valentine & Sons and Sackett & Willhelms Company in 1909, becoming Leighton & Valentine. That business continued until 1914.

== Leighton family ==
Adam Phillips Leighton was born in West Falmouth, Maine, in 1851, to Adam W. Leighton and Julia Ann Leighton (also née Leighton). He married Isadore Mary Butler in 1873, with whom he had two children: Hugh Chisholm and Dr. Adam Phillips Jr. He was mayor of Portland, Maine, between 1908 and 1909. He died in 1922, aged 71. He was interred in Portland's Evergreen Cemetery, alongside his wife, who preceded him in death by nine years.

Hugh Chisholm Leighton was born in Maine in 1878. He graduated from Williams College in Williamstown, Massachusetts.

He married twice; firstly to Elizabeth Esther Wilcox in 1908, then to Pauline Frederick (her fourth husband in 21 years) in April 1930. Leighton was living at 45 East 62nd Street in New York City at the time. He had the marriage annulled eight months later, claiming that he was Frederick's husband "in name only". He had one known child—Margaret Jane Sturges—from his first marriage.

He went on to co-found Interstate News Company, which operated over 250 restaurants around the United States. He became its president.

Leighton died in White Plains, New York, in 1942. He was 63. He was buried in Glen Abbey Memorial Park in Bonita, California.
