= Masonic Temple (Portland, Maine) =

- U.S. National Register of Historic Places
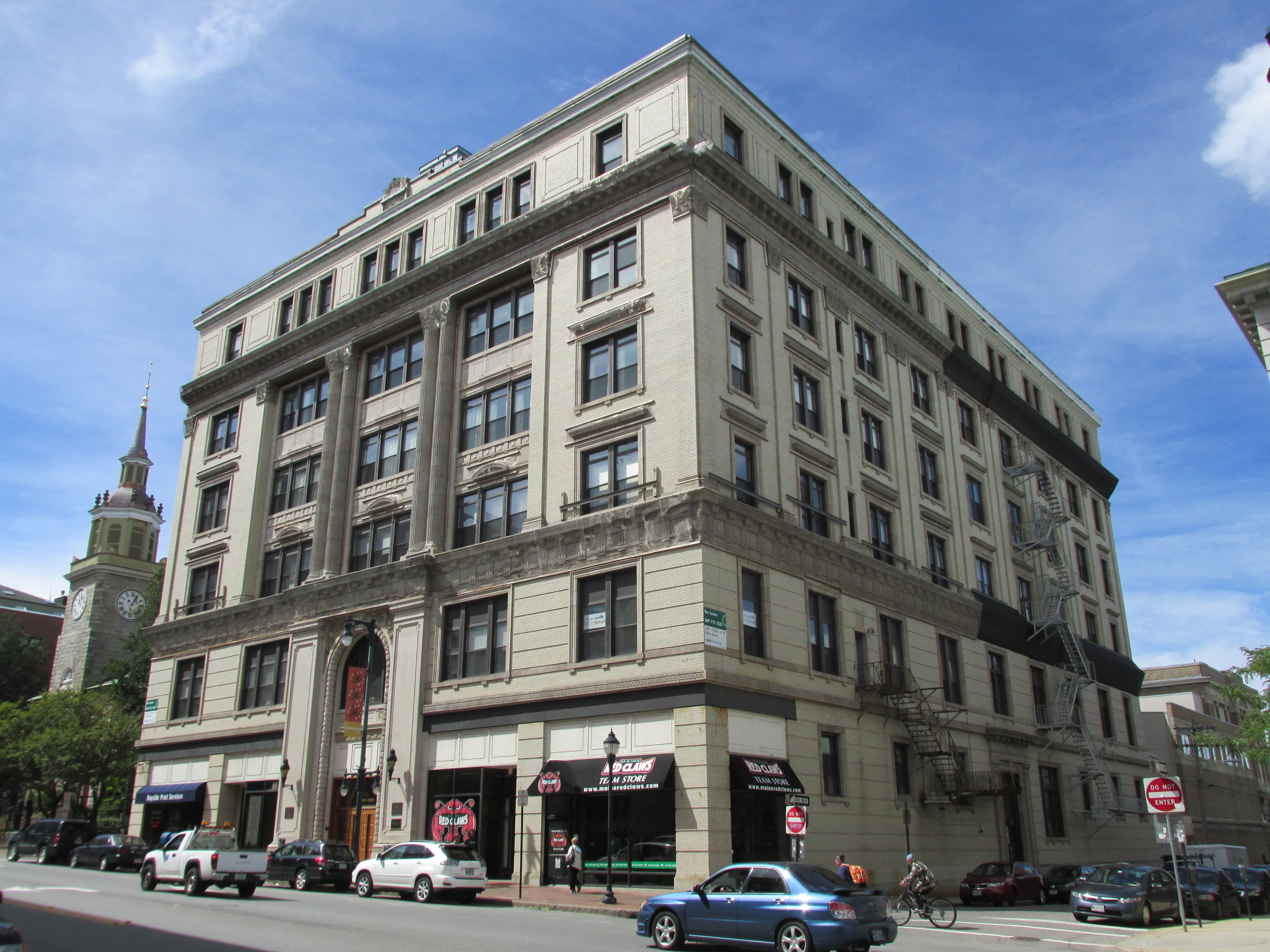
- Pictured in 2013

- Location within Maine Location within the United States
- Location: 415 Congress St., Portland, Maine
- Coordinates: 43°39′32″N 70°15′30″W
- Area: 1 acre (0.40 ha)
- Built: 1911
- Architect: Frederick A. Tompson
- Architectural style: Beaux Arts
- NRHP reference No.: 82000748
- Added to NRHP: February 11, 1982

The Masonic Temple is a historic commercial and fraternal society building at 415 Congress Street in downtown Portland, Maine. Built in 1911, to a design by local architect Frederick A. Tompson, it is one of the city's finest examples of Beaux Arts architecture, and houses some of the state's grandest interior spaces. It was listed on the National Register of Historic Places in 1982.

== Description and history ==
The Portland Masonic Temple occupies a prominent position in the city's downtown, set between City Hall and the First Parish Church on the north side of Congress Street, the city's main commercial thoroughfare. Its construction saw the demolition of the Chase Hotel, the previous home and office of physician Edwin F. Vose, and several businesses.

It is a brick and stone building, six stories in height, with a flat roof. Its main facade is divided into five sections, with four storefronts flanking a central two-story entrance. The entrance has wide paneled pilasters on either side, and a round-arch window at the second level. A beltcourse frieze with ornate decorate stonework separates the second and third levels. The middle three bays of the third through fifth floors are recessed, with flanking Corinthian pilasters and paired Corinthian columns on either side of the central bay.

The Grand Lodge of Maine was established in 1820, although its oldest lodge was founded in 1762, with a charter signed by Paul Revere and others. This building has been the principal center of Masonic activity in the state since its construction in 1911. The Masons put the building up for sale in 2008, citing the high cost of its maintenance, but a deal to convert the building to condominiums fell through. They have now opened their spaces, which include some of the finest large spaces in the city, for event rental as a means to support its upkeep.

== See also ==
- National Register of Historic Places listings in Portland, Maine
