= Everett Chambers =

- U.S. National Register of Historic Places
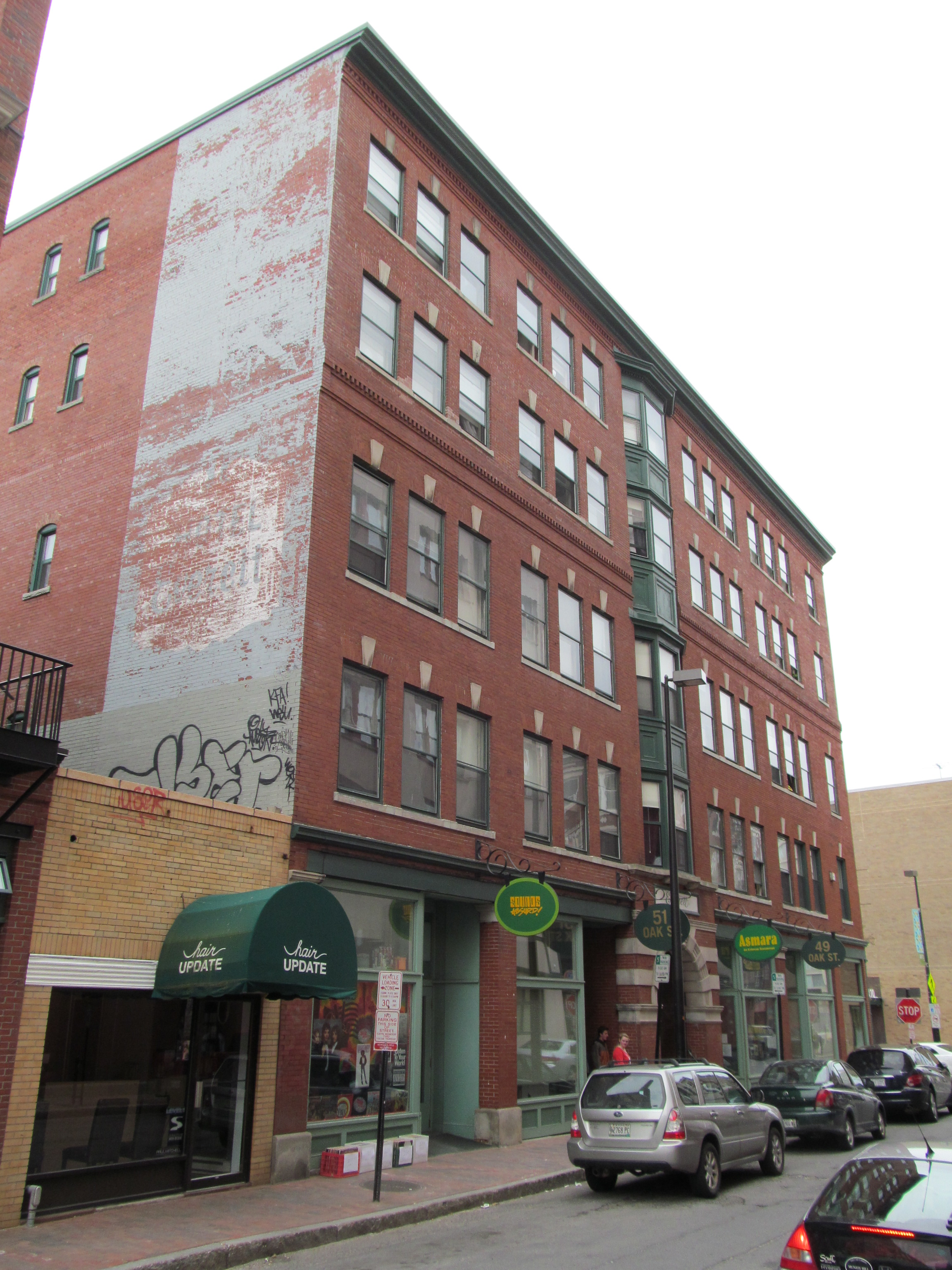
- Everett Chambers

- Location within Maine Location within the United States
- Location: 47-55 Oak St., Portland, Maine
- Coordinates: 43°39′18″N 70°15′42″W
- Area: less than one acre
- Built: 1902
- Architect: Frederick A. Tompson
- Architectural style: Colonial Revival
- NRHP reference No.: 06000397
- Added to NRHP: May 19, 2006

The Everett Chambers or Hotel Everett is a historic mixed-use commercial and residential building at 47-55 Oak Street in Downtown Portland, Maine. Built in 1902 to a design by local architect Frederick Tompson, it is an important surviving example of a lodging house (in which meals are not provided), built early in the transition period from the 19th century boarding house (in which meals were provided by the proprietor) to more modern 20th-century transient accommodations. It was added to the National Register of Historic Places in 2004.

== Description and history ==
The Everett Chambers building is located one block off Congress Street, Portland's central commercial thoroughfare, at the northern corner of Oak and Free Streets. The street-facing facades of this five-story building are faced in brick, with limestone trim elements. The Oak Street facade has four retail storefronts on the street level, articulated by brick pilasters, with a clipped corner providing access to a single storefront facing Free Street. The Oak Street facade is fourteen bays wide, divided roughly into groups of three on shared sills, with a single separate bay at the corner, and a projecting polygonal metal-faced bay near the center, above the main building entrance. Courses of projecting brickwork separate the third and fourth floors. The interior of the upper floors is divided into single-room accommodations, intended for one or two person occupancy. Many rooms retain original features, including decorative wood finishes and fixtures such as sinks. Bathrooms, which were shared among all of the tenants, are located on each floor.

Everett Chambers was built in 1902 to a design by Frederick Tompson, a prominent local architect, and is one of the best-preserved local examples of his work. It represented a relatively new trend in accommodations for transients (typically staying for one month or less), providing lodging but not meals, as earlier boarding houses did. It was originally three stories in height, and was extended in height in 1926 to add additional rooms. Despite its intended use as transient housing, the building had several long-term residents who lived there for several years. One well-known transient resident was Admiral Robert E. Peary. The building was operated as a lodging house until 1971; it is now used as a dormitory, housing students of the nearby Maine College of Art.

== See also ==
- National Register of Historic Places listings in Portland, Maine
- Marcy's Diner, located in the building's ground floor
