= First Lutheran Church (Ketchikan, Alaska) =

Historic church in Alaska, United States

- U.S. National Register of Historic Places
- Alaska Heritage Resources Survey
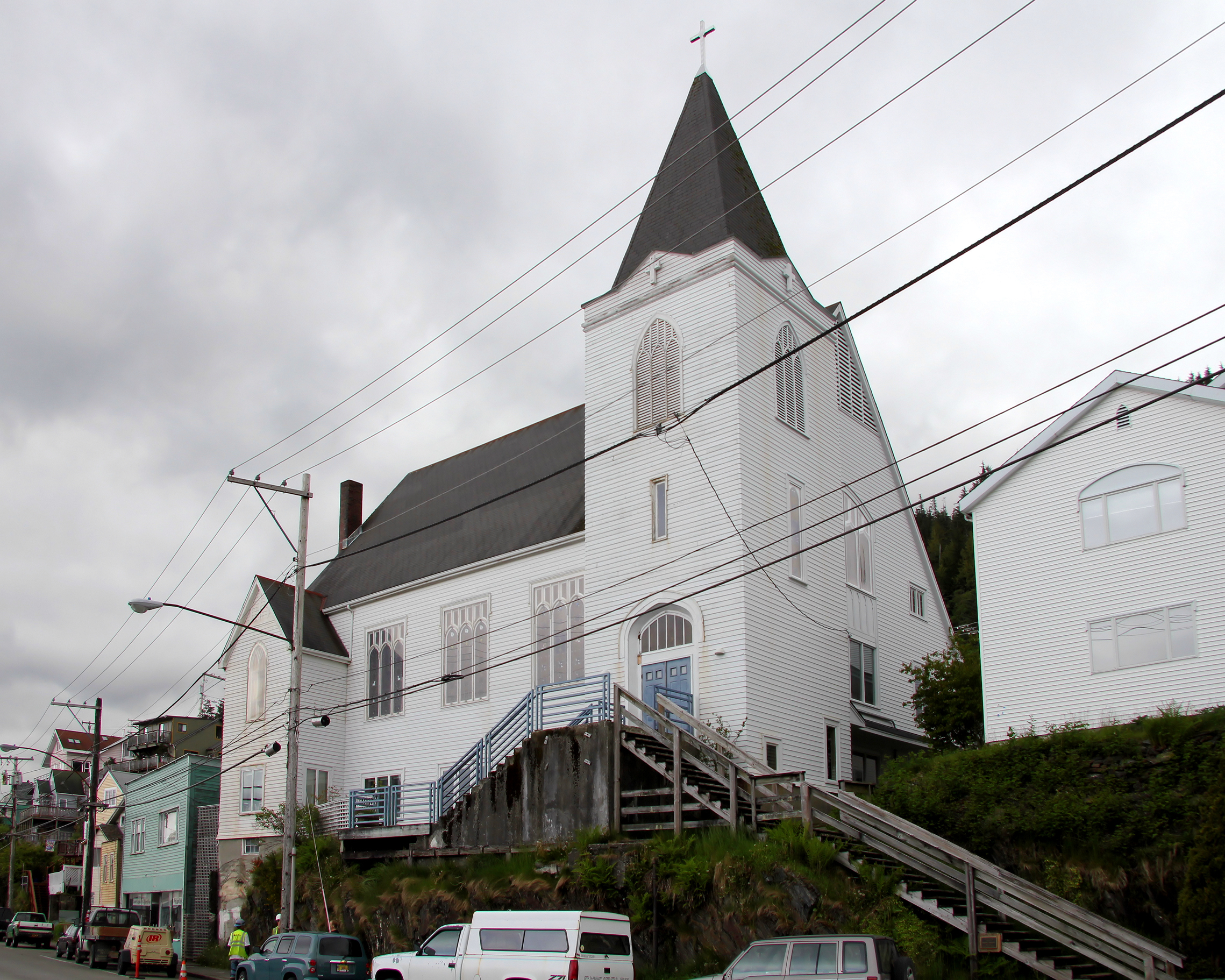

- Location within Alaska
- Location: 1200 Tongass Avenue, Ketchikan, Alaska
- Coordinates: 55°20′43″N 131°39′28″W
- Area: less than one acre
- Built: 1930
- Built by: Carl Foss
- Architect: W.G. Brust
- Architectural style: Late Gothic Revival
- Website: https://firstlutheranketchikan.com/
- NRHP reference No.: 87000716
- AHRS No.: KET-141

Significant dates
- Added to NRHP: May 18, 1987
- Designated AHRS: June 30, 1980

The First Lutheran Church in Ketchikan, Alaska, is a historic church at 1200 Tongass Avenue. It was designed by architect W.G. Brust of Seattle and was built in 1930 by Ketchikan local builder Carl Foss. It is a two-story wood-frame structure, with a three-story tower at its southwest corner. The windows along the sides are rectangular sash windows on the first level, and narrow Gothic lancet windows on the taller second level grouped in threes in rectangular openings. The main entry is in through an arched opening in the tower, with the door topped by a multi-light transom window.

The building was added to the National Register of Historic Places in 1987.

== See also ==
- Walker-Broderick House, also built by Carl Foss and NRHP-listed in Ketchikan
- National Register of Historic Places listings in Ketchikan Gateway Borough, Alaska
