= Portland Academy (Maine) =

Former private school in Portland, Maine

Portland Academy was a private school in Portland, Maine.

== History ==
Portland Academy was chartered by the Commonwealth of Massachusetts on February 27, 1794 while Portland was still part of that state. It was located in a new brick building on Congress Street, close to the Wadsworth-Longfellow House. Instruction began in 1803 and, in 1808, a three-story brick structure was completed and became the academy's longtime home. Many of its alumni were from the city's elite families, such as the Browns, Dows, and Longfellows. Henry Wadsworth Longfellow studied at Portland Academy from 1813 to 1821. A fire in 1816 destroyed the school's early records and the 1866 great fire of Portland, Maine burned the school's previous home to the ground. Both fires destroyed the academy's records and thus relatively little is known about the institution overall.

== Notable alumni ==
- John Marshall Brown
- Fred Dow
- Henry Wadsworth Longfellow
- Samuel Longfellow

== See also ==
- Education in Maine
