= Bramhall (mansion) =

Former house in Portland, Maine

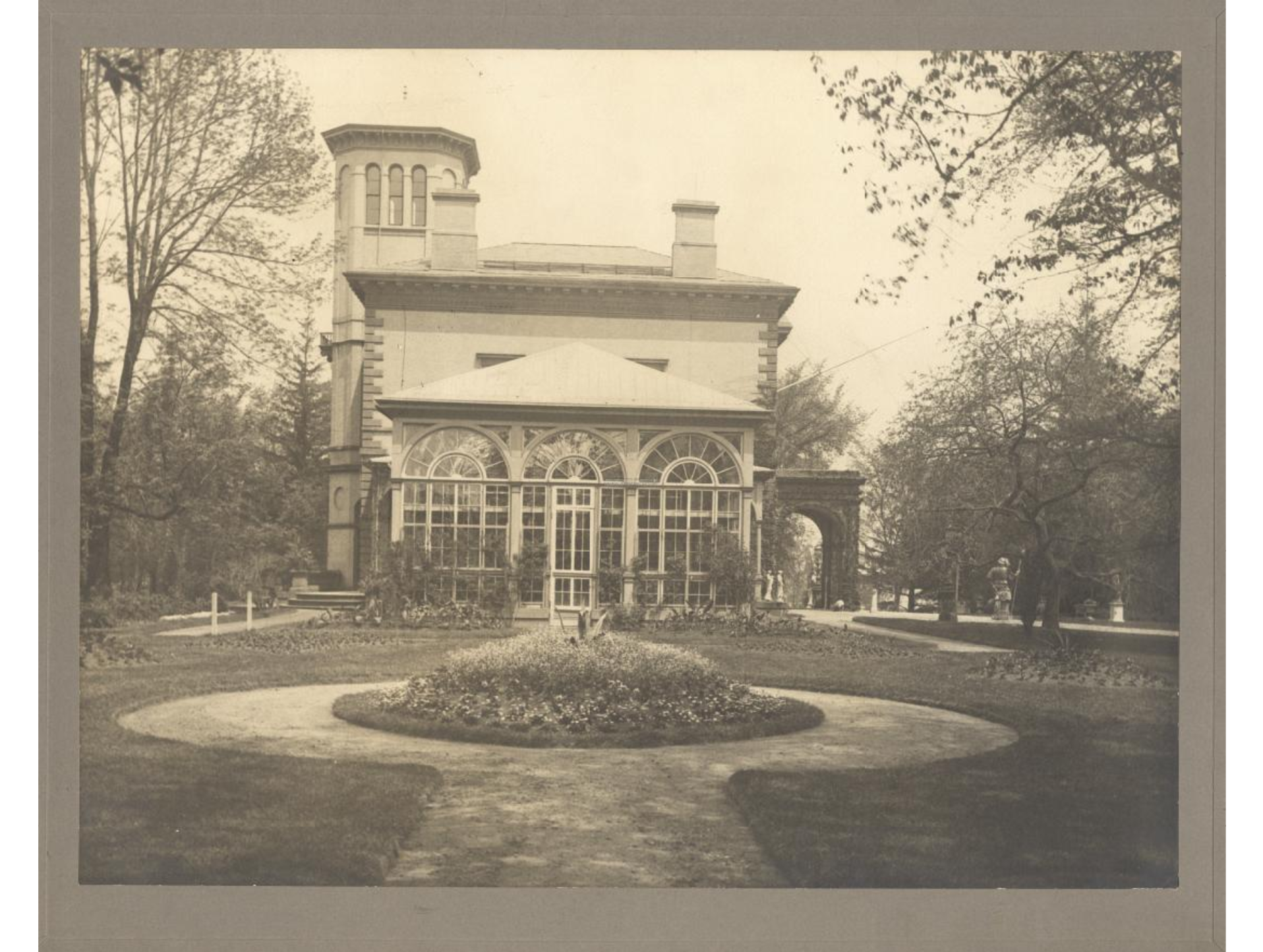
- The building's southern elevation pictured in the second half of the 19th century
- Interactive map of the Bramhall area

General information
- Location: Western Promenade
- Coordinates: 43.6474°N 70.2751°W
- Completed: 1858
- Demolished: 1915 (111 years ago)
- Owner: John Bundy Brown

Design and construction
- Architect: Charles A. Alexander

Bramhall was a mansion in the Western Promenade neighborhood of Portland, Maine, United States. Completed in 1858, it was owned by John Bundy Brown, an industrialist. The mansion, which was designed by New York City architect Charles A. Alexander, stood behind today's 147–163 Western Promenade, near which he also built homes for his children. In 1915, 34 after Brown's death, the mansion, which was the largest residence in Portland, was demolished. The 10 acres (4.0 ha) of land bounded by Bowdoin Street, Pine Street, Vaughan Street and Western Promenade was sold parcel by parcel, and the present neighborhood was built. The area is now part of the Western Promenade Historic District.

The building, which had a conservatory on its southern side, was demolished in 1915.
