= Philip Greely Jr. =

American merchant

Philip Greely Jr. (November 1, 1809 – March 15, 1854) was an American merchant who served as Collector of Customs for the Port of Boston from 1849 to 1853.

== Early life ==
Greeley was born on November 1, 1809, in Portland, Maine. His parents were Philip Greely Sr. and Dorcas (Blanchard) Greely. On November 26, 1833, he married Sarah Tyler, daughter of Dartmouth College president Bennet Tyler.

== Business career ==
Greely was a partner of the firm Greely and Guild with George F. Guild. The firm was heavily involved in the West Indies trade. The firm imported a large quantity of molasses and in 1845 opened a sugar house in Portland, Maine with Greely's brother-in-law John Bundy Brown. They also co-owned a wire factory, annealing house, and sawmill in Harrison, Maine. The firm failed and left behind a number of debts.

== Politics ==
Greely served as secretary to the Whig Central Committee and was a member of the executive committee of the Boston chapter of the American Union for the Relief and Improvement of the Colored Race. In 1837, 1840, and 1848 he was a member of the Boston Common Council from Ward 5. He was also a member of the Boston citizen's committee that raised funds for the people of Fall River, Massachusetts following the Great Fire of 1843 and was on the board of managers of the Massachusetts Sabbath School Society from 1842 until his death.

In 1849, president Zachary Taylor appointed Greely Collector of Customs for the Port of Boston. Daniel Webster attempted to persuade Taylor's successor, Millard Fillmore, to withdraw Greely's nomination, citing the unpaid debts from his failed business. Webster wrote that Greely "did not possess the proper weight of general character & reputation" and should have never been appointed. Fillmore did not withdraw Greely's nomination and he was confirmed by the United States Senate on September 25, 1850. Greely assured Fillmore that he would support his administration, however he instead backed Winfield Scott for the Whig nomination for president in 1852. Greely helped turn the Massachusetts and Maine delegates to Scott, which secured the nomination for him. He resigned following the inauguration of Fillmore's Democratic successor, Franklin Pierce.

The following year, Greely contracted yellow fever while on business in Havana. He died there on March 15, 1854.

Government offices
Preceded by Marcus Morton	Collector of Customs for the Port of Boston; 1849–1853	Succeeded by Charles H. Peaslee
