= Walker Building =

Walker Building, Walker Company or Walker Factory, may refer to:

- J. W. Walker Building-Central Arizona Light & Power, Phoenix, Arizona, listed on the NRHP in Phoenix, Arizona
- Walker Body Company Factory, Amesbury, Massachusetts, listed on the NRHP in Essex County, Massachusetts
- Walker Building (Springfield, Massachusetts), listed on the NRHP in Hampden County, Massachusetts
- Walker and Weeks Office Building, Cleveland, Ohio, listed on the National Register of Historic Places listings in Cleveland, Ohio
- Walker Building (Stillwater, Oklahoma), listed on the NRHP in Payne County, Oklahoma
- Walker Bank Building, Salt Lake City, Utah, listed on the NRHP in Salt Lake City, Utah
- Walker Apartment Hotel, Tacoma, Washington, listed on the National Register of Historic Places in Pierce County, Washington
- Walker Cut Stone Company, Wilkeson, Washington, listed on the National Register of Historic Places in Pierce County, Washington

== See also ==
- Walker House (disambiguation)
