= Bogle-Walker House =

Historic house in Massachusetts, United States

- U.S. National Register of Historic Places
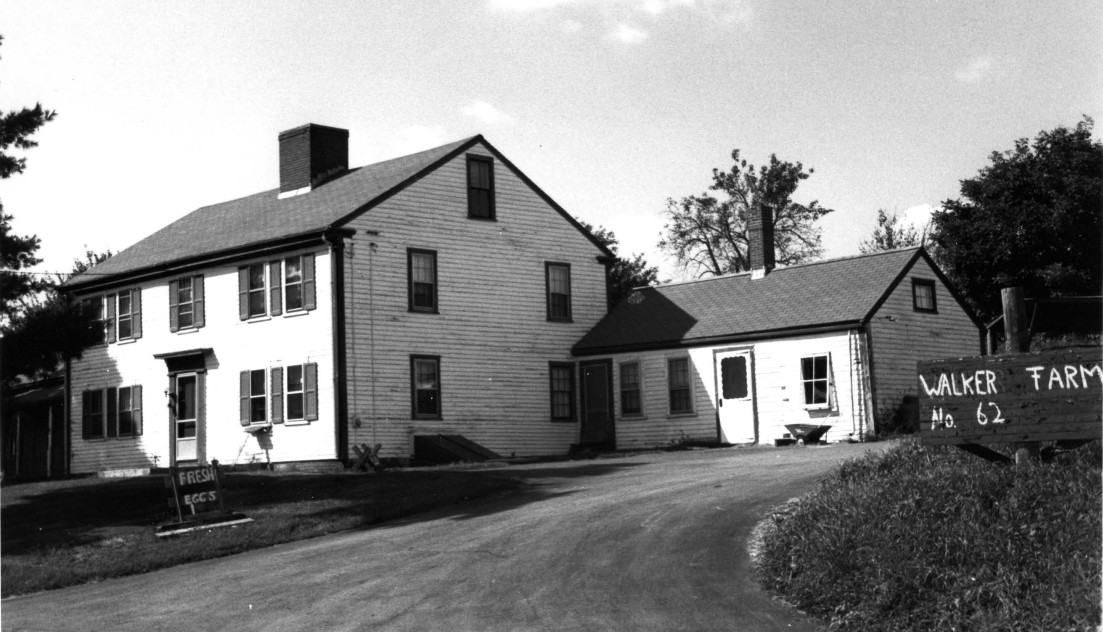
- 1985 photo

- Location within Massachusetts Location within the United States
- Location: 55 and 62 Goodman's Rd., Sudbury, Massachusetts
- Coordinates: 42°21′54″N 71°24′6″W
- Built: 1806
- Architectural style: Georgian
- NRHP reference No.: 92001044
- Added to NRHP: August 27, 1992

The Bogle-Walker House was a historic house in Sudbury, Massachusetts. The house, built c. 1806, was the centerpiece of a farm that remained in the same family's hands until the 1980s. It was stylistically a Georgian house, showing how 18th century styles persisted into the early 19th century in rural areas. The house was listed on the National Register of Historic Places in 1992.

The farmland on which the house sat has since been subdivided into house lots and the house itself was dismantled.

== See also ==
- National Register of Historic Places listings in Middlesex County, Massachusetts
