= Walker-Broderick House =

Historic house in Alaska, United States

- U.S. National Register of Historic Places
- Alaska Heritage Resources Survey
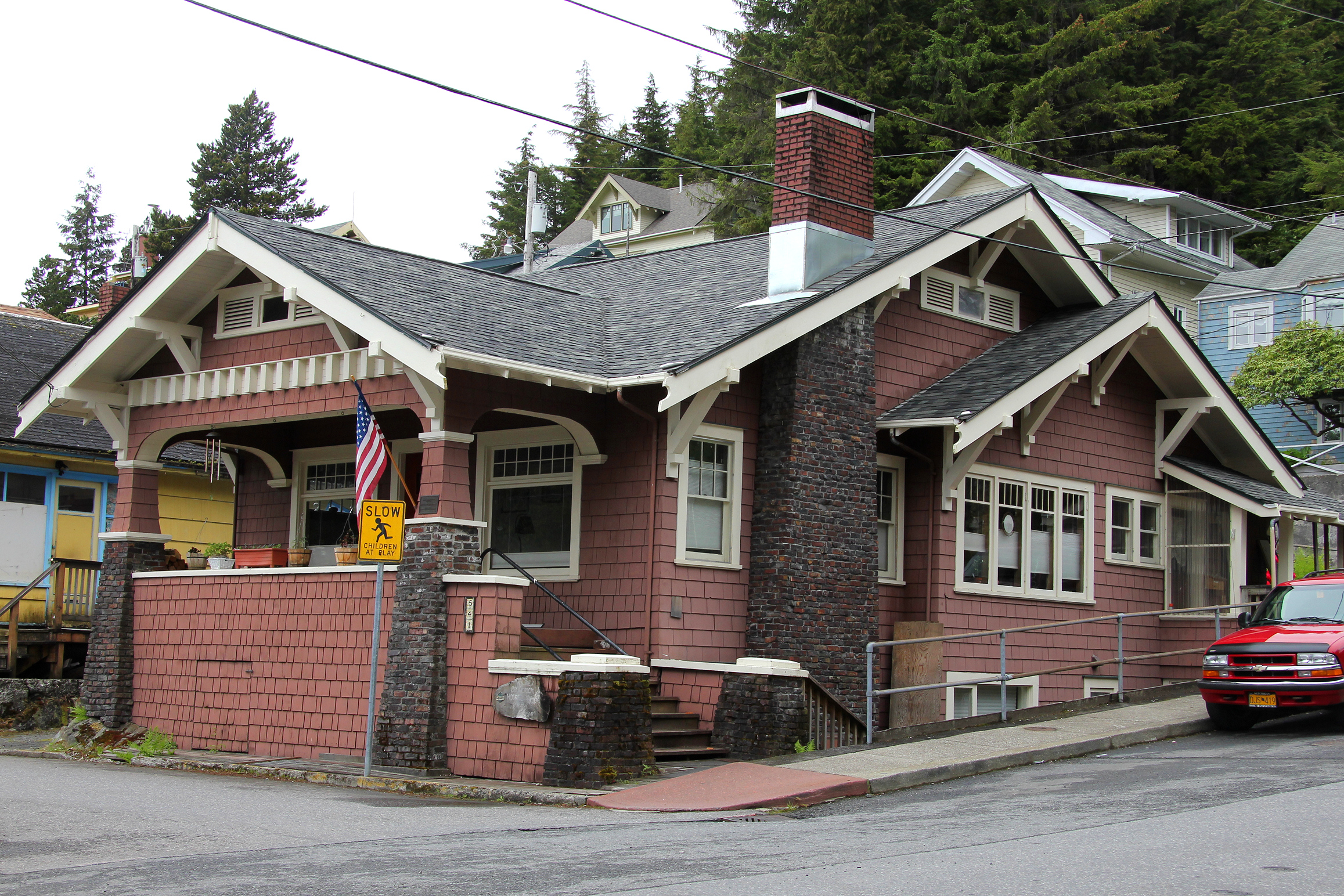

- Location within Alaska
- Location: 541 Pine Street, Ketchikan, Alaska
- Coordinates: 55°20′40″N 131°38′48″W
- Area: less than one acre
- Built: 1920
- Built by: Carl Foss
- Architectural style: Bungalow/Craftsman
- NRHP reference No.: 82004903
- AHRS No.: KET-138

Significant dates
- Added to NRHP: August 31, 1982
- Designated AHRS: June 30, 1980

The Walker-Broderick House, also known as the "Doc" Walker House, is a historic house at 541 Pine Street in Ketchikan, Alaska. It was listed on the National Register of Historic Places in 1982. The house is a single-story wood-frame structure, built in 1916–20 by local Ketchikan master builder Carl Foss. The house is an excellent local example of Craftsman styling, with broad eaves supported by large knee arches, large brick piers supporting the front porch, and a matching brick chimney on the side. Interior woodwork is well-preserved. The house was built for Norman "Doc" Walker, an early Ketchikan resident, pharmacist, and politician who served as mayor and in the Alaska Territorial Senate

== See also ==
- First Lutheran Church (Ketchikan, Alaska), also built by Carl Foss and NRHP-listed
- National Register of Historic Places listings in Ketchikan Gateway Borough, Alaska
