= John Bundy Brown =

American industrialist

John Bundy Brown (May 31, 1805 – January 10, 1881) was an American industrialist from Portland, Maine, who owned the Portland Sugar Company, which processed molasses imported from the Caribbean into sugar.

== Early life ==
Brown was born on May 31, 1805, in Lancaster, New Hampshire, to Titus Olcott Brown and Susannah (Bundy) Brown. His grandfather relocated into New Hampshire from Stonington, Connecticut, and became one of the pioneer settlers of Lancaster. Brown attended public schools and the Hebron Academy. He began working at a young age in Portland as a dollar-per-week grocery clerk. By 23, he and a fellow clerk established their start-up grocery business which later started to import large quantities of sugar, molasses, and rum from the West Indies.

== Business career ==
Brown entered the sugar business in 1845 when he, his brother-in-law Philip Greely Jr., and George F. Guild owned a sugar house in Portland. Greely and Guild were heavily involved in the West Indies trade and imported a large quantity of molasses. This company was involved in the importation of slave-produced sugar from the Caribbean and the processing of it into rum and molasses. After Greely and Guild's firm company failed, Brown took over the entire business. The business was not successful in its early years because it was unable to produce the required granulation using known processes. However, it became lucrative after Brown's agent, Dependence H. Furbush, developed a process that used steam power to extract a sugar from molasses. In 1855, Brown, Furbush, and Brown's son Philip H. Brown chartered the Portland Sugar Company, formerly located at the corner of York Street and Maple Street.

Brown was Maine's wealthiest resident and Portland's largest landowner. He owned over 400-plus acres in Portland's West End. The Western Promenade was built on Brown's land. 17 of his properties, including the Portland Sugar House, were destroyed in the 1866 Portland Fire. Brown rebuilt his businesses, including a new sugar house and the Falmouth Hotel, and constructed a number of mansions, including his own Bramhall. J.B. Brown & Sons, founded by Brown, continues to own, manage and develop commercial properties in Portland. The J.B. Brown Memorial Building on Congress Street was constructed by Brown's sons after his death and was named in his honor.

Brown was the president of the Portland Savings Bank, Portland Board of Trade, and Maine General Hospital, an incorporator of the St. Lawrence and Atlantic Railroad, a trustee of Bowdoin College, and a director of a number of other businesses, including the Maine Central Railroad Company.

Brown was a member of the Whig and Republican parties. He was a member of the Maine Senate in 1857 and a presidential elector in 1860.

== Family ==
Brown married Ann Matilda Greely, daughter of Portland’s Philip Greely on September 30, 1830. They had five children, Philip, James, Ellen, John Marshall, and Matilda. Two of Brown's children married children of Nathan Clifford - Ellen Brown married William H. Clifford and Philip Brown married Fanny Clifford. Brown's son, John Marshall Brown, was an officer during the American Civil War and fought in several major battles including the Battle of Gettysburg.

Brown's descendants include Nathan Clifford Brown and Howard H. Dana Jr.

== Death ==
Brown died on January 10, 1881, at his home in Portland. He was 76. Helen Holt Emerson (1909–2003), wife of Charles Plummer Emerson (1908–2007), gave a version of the events leading to Brown's death.

They had a wooden walk built up to Bramhall in the winter. He was coming home from a party or something and slipped on the edge [of the walk] and hit his head. He was in bed, and he said get his lawyers that there was something he wanted to do.

— John Clifford Brown, Gentleman Soldier

It is believed he wanted to amend his will, because he had not yet provided in it for his sons' wives and his daughters' husbands, but he had trouble conveying his intentions. The lawyers arrived on horseback via Bowdoin Street in the middle of the night and brought Brown's will to his bedside. The lawyers asked him to sign it, but Brown was unable. They said it would be permissible if he just made a cross, witnessed by the party. After his death, his sons Philip Henry and John Marshall constructed the Brown Memorial Building at Congress and Casco Streets in 1883.
