= Walker Memorial Library =

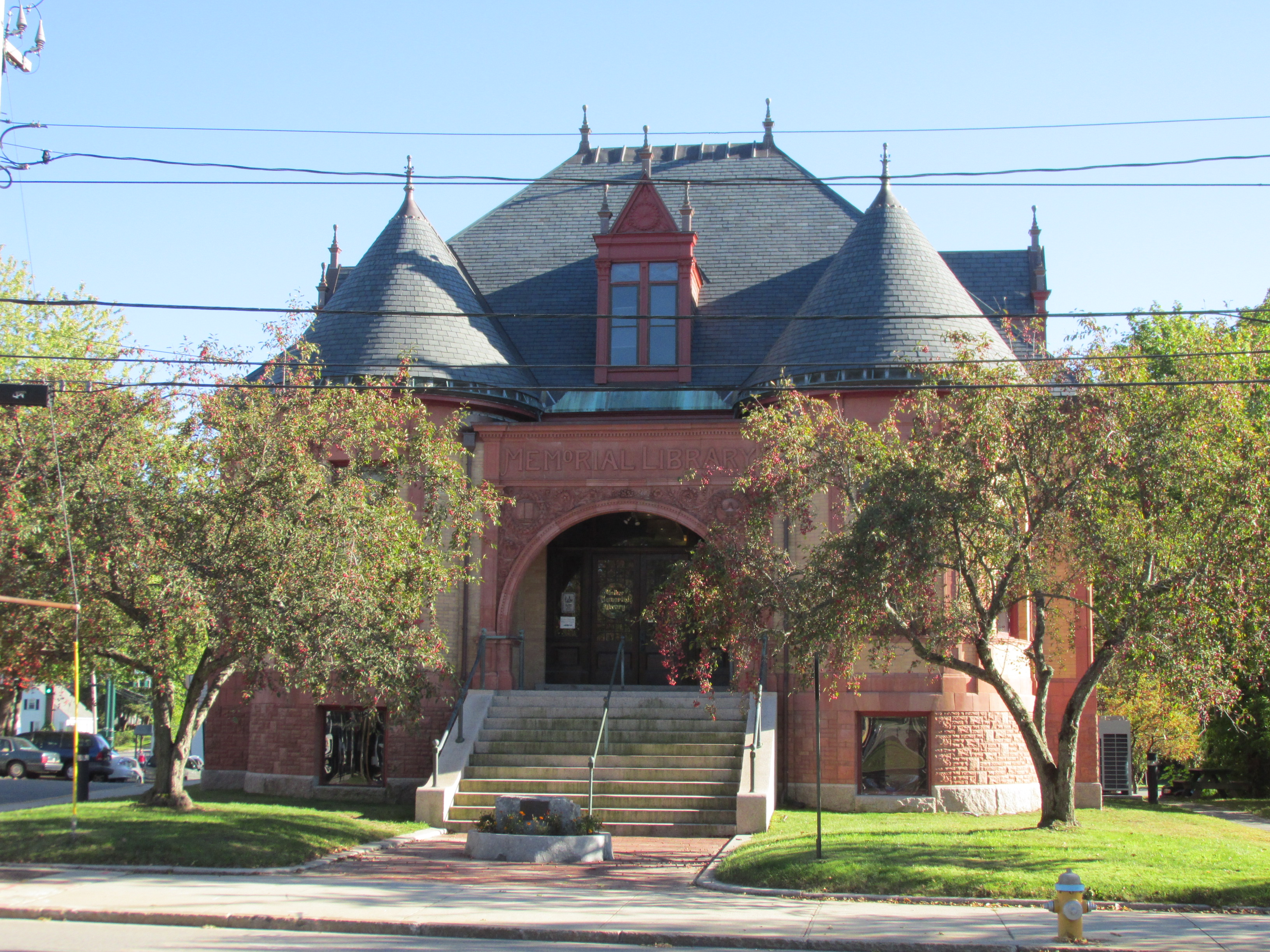
- Location: 800 Main Street, Westbrook, Maine, U.S., United States
- Type: Public
- Established: 1894

Collection
- Size: 49,000

Access and use
- Circulation: 119,000
- Population served: 17,494

Other information
- Budget: $457,899
- Director: Rebecca Albert
- Employees: 13
- Website: https://walkerlibrary.org/
- Walker Memorial Library
- U.S. National Register of Historic Places
- Location within Maine Location within the United States
- Coordinates: 43°40′34″N 70°21′51″W
- Built: 1894
- Architect: Frederick A. Tompson
- Architectural style: French Chateauesque
- NRHP reference No.: 80000231
- Added to NRHP: November 10, 1980

The Walker Memorial Library is the public library of Westbrook, Maine, United States. It is located at 800 Main Street, in an architecturally distinguished French Chateauesque building designed by Frederick A. Tompson and built in 1894. It was added to the National Register of Historic Places in 1980.

== Architecture and history ==
The library is located in downtown Westbrook, between William Clark Drive and Main Street (State Route 258). It is a three-story brick building, built in an elaborate style resembling a French chateau. It has a hip roof whose ridge lines and dormers are adorned with finials. The main entrance, facing north toward Main Street, is recessed behind a round arch set between two round turrets with conical roofs. The exterior is accented by decorative use of yellow brick, and panels of terra cotta. The interior features extensive use of oak beams and filigreed woodwork.

Westbrook's first public library began in 1802 as a social lending library, one of the first such institutions in what is now Maine. This organization became dormant in 1866, but was revived in 1883. In 1891 the town was bequested funds for a library building in the will of Joseph Walker, a Westbrook native who made his fortune in the lumber industry. The main building was designed by Portland architect Frederick Tompson, then one of Maine's leading architects. An addition to the 1894 structure was added in 1989 via municipal bond.

== See also ==
- National Register of Historic Places listings in Cumberland County, Maine
