= John Marshall Brown =

American commissioned officer during the American Civil War

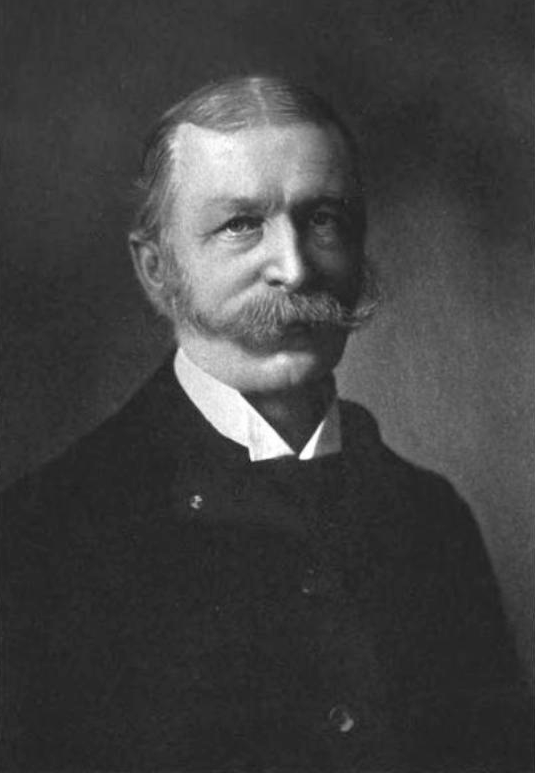
- Born: December 14, 1838; Portland, Maine
- Died: July 20, 1907 (aged 68); Portland, Maine
- Occupation: Military officer
- Spouse: Alida Catherine Carroll (m. 1866)
- Parents: John Bundy Brown (father); Anna Matilda Greely (mother)

John Marshall Brown (December 14, 1838 – July 20, 1907) was an American commissioned officer during the American Civil War.

== Biography ==
The son of sugar magnate John Bundy Brown and Anna Matilda Brown (née Greely), he was born in Portland, Maine on December 14, 1838. He attended Portland Academy, Gould Academy, and Phillips Academy before graduating from Bowdoin College in 1860. At Bowdoin, he was a student of Joshua Chamberlain, who later was his commander during the Civil War. In August 1862, while studying for the bar, he was commissioned first lieutenant and adjutant of the 20th Maine Infantry Regiment. His regiment fought at the battles of Antietam, Fredericksburg, Chancellorsville, and Gettysburg among others. He was promoted to Lieutenant Colonel of the 32nd Maine Infantry Regiment before being injured and discharged in 1864.

He married Alida Catherine Carroll of Washington D.C. in 1866.

Brown died from appendicitis in Portland on July 20, 1907.

== Legacy ==
The special collections research library of the Maine Historical Society is named for Brown and his wife Alida (Carroll) Brown.
