= Western Promenade =

- U.S. National Register of Historic Places
- U.S. Historic district
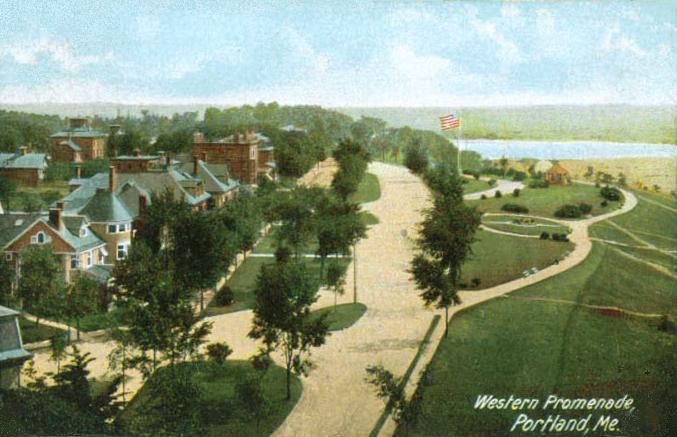
- A postcard of the Western Promenade circa 1908

- Location within Maine Location within the United States
- Location: Roughly Western Promenade from Maine Medical Center to Valley St., Portland, Maine
- Coordinates: 43°38′48″N 70°16′32″W
- Area: 18.1 acres (7.3 ha)
- Built: 1836
- Architect: Goodwin, William; Olmsted Brothers
- NRHP reference No.: 89001710
- Added to NRHP: October 16, 1989

The Western Promenade is a historic promenade, an 18.1-acre (7.3 ha) public park and recreation area in the West End neighborhood of Portland, Maine. Developed between 1836 and the early 20th century, it is one Portland's oldest preserved spaces, with landscaping by the Olmsted Brothers, who included it in their master plan for the city's parks. The promenade was listed on the National Register of Historic Places in 1989.

== Description and history ==
The Western Promenade occupies land overlooking a bluff on the western side of the Portland peninsula. It is bounded on the north by the Maine Medical Center complex, the east by the Western Cemetery and a historic 19th-century residential neighborhood (listed on the National Register as the Western Promenade Historic District), and the west by Valley Street. The park is now over 18 acres (7.3 ha) in size, and basically linear in shape. The park provides views to the west which include the White Mountains of New Hampshire. The steep slope of the bluff is wooded, except for a section near West Street where a trail is cut down to Valley Street. The network of trails on the bluff is essentially that laid out by John C. Olmsted in 1905.

The city began acquiring land on the peninsula's western bluff as early as 1836, since it had long been recognized for its scenery and views, and there was public pressure for increased open space on the increasingly urbanized peninsula. At some point a tree-lined drive was built along the bluff. Beginning in the late 1870s, city engineer William Goodwin championed efforts to further improve the park. In the 1890s and 1900s, Mayor James Phinney Baxter engineered the expansion of the park to its present dimensions, and hired the Olmsted Brothers to oversee a landscaping plan for the park, and to develop a master plan for the city's parks. Design work on the Western Promenade is credited to John C. Olmsted and Henry Vincent Hubbard, then an apprentice with the Olmsted firm.

== Neighborhood ==
The Western Promenade name also applies to the neighborhood adjacent to the park itself. In the nineteenth century, the land was owned by industrialist John Bundy Brown, who was one of the wealthiest men in Maine. He owned a sugar refinery (the Portland Sugar Company) in which a mainly Irish immigrant workforce refined molasses into raw granulated sugar. He built the "Bramhall" mansion, which stood behind today's 147–163 Western Promenade, as well as homes for his children. After his death, the mansion was demolished, the 10 acres (4.0 ha) of land bounded by Bowdoin Street, Pine Street, Vaughan Street and Western Promenade was sold parcel by parcel, and the present neighborhood was built. It is home to a significant number of mansions and historic homes originally built for Portland's wealthiest and most powerful residents. The Western Promenade Historic District encompasses many of the homes in the neighborhood.

The Western Promenade Neighborhood Association was founded in 1973 and describes itself as "dedicated to the uplifting, improvement, beautification, home security, and preservation of the Bramhall Hill section of Portland with particular interest in the historical and cultural nature of the neighborhood." As of 2021, its president is former mayor Anne Pringle.

== Gallery ==
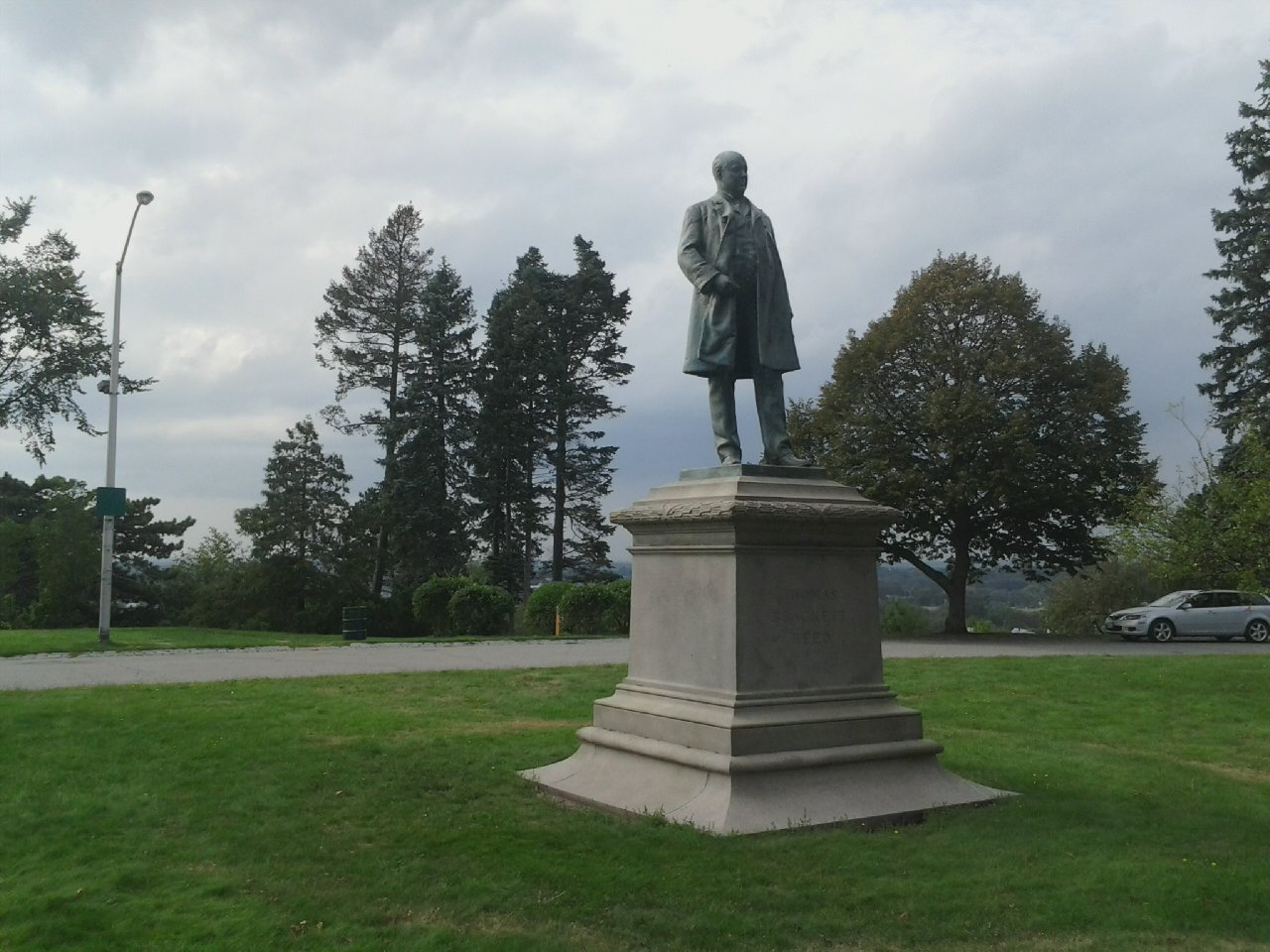
The Western Promenade and a statue of Thomas Brackett Reed, Speaker of the U.S. House of Representatives

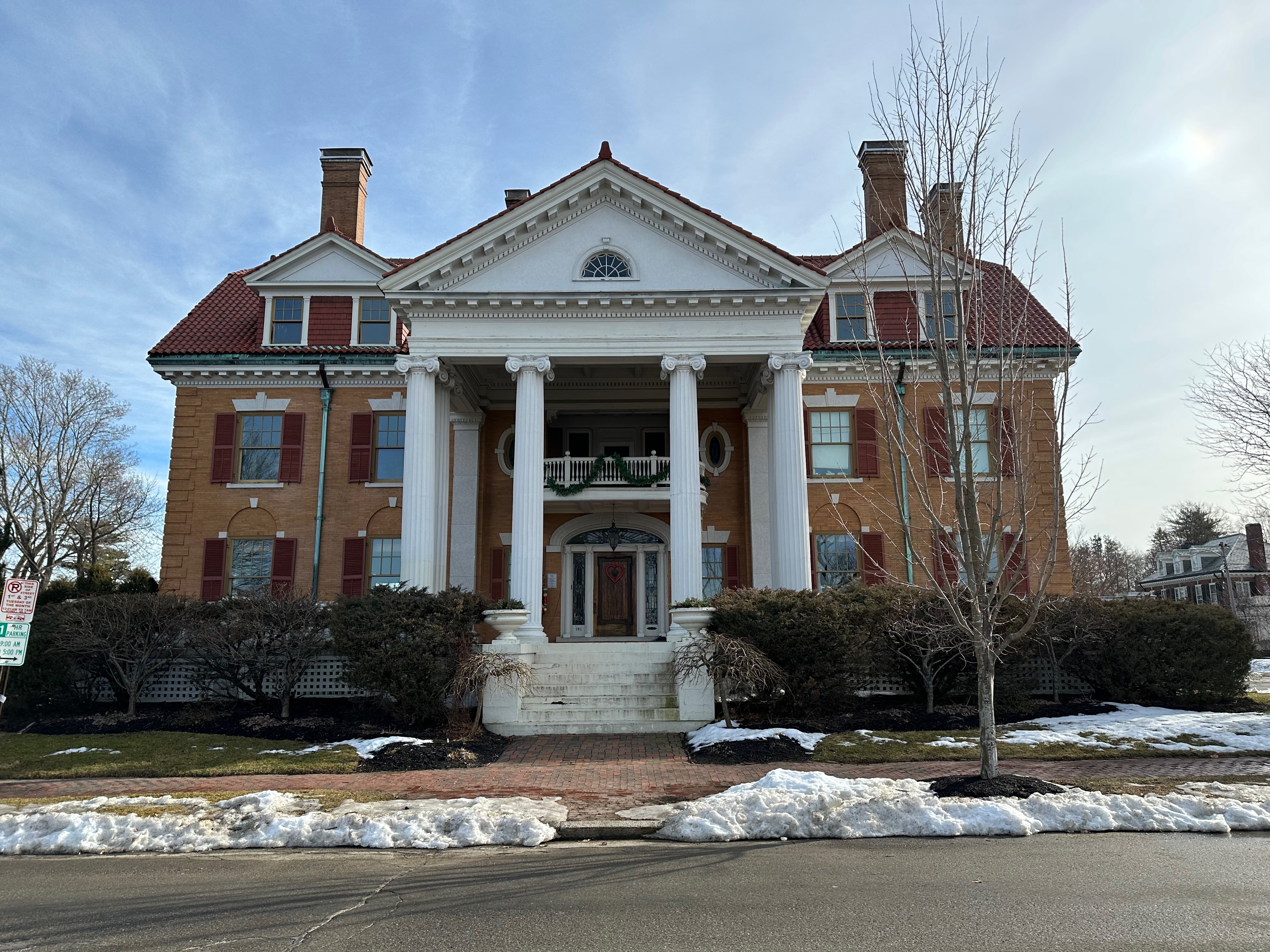
West Mansion, designed by Portland architect Frederick A. Tompson

== See also ==
- National Register of Historic Places listings in Portland, Maine
- Eastern Promenade, on the opposite end of the peninsula
- Portland Railroad Company
