= Walker Memorial Hall =

- U.S. National Register of Historic Places
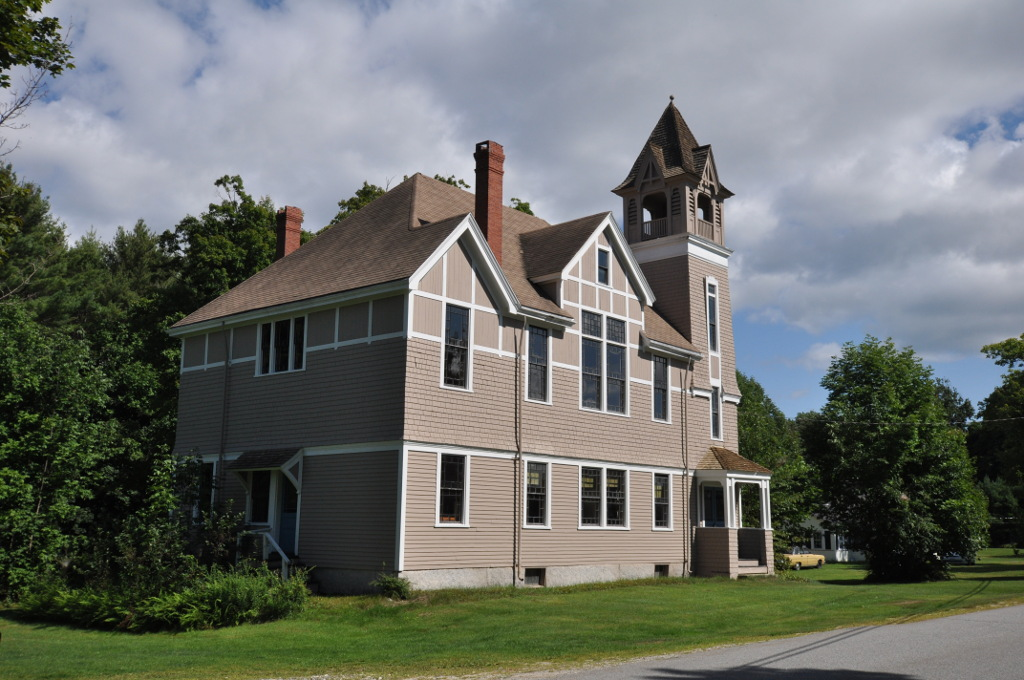

- Location within Maine Location within the United States
- Location: 411 Highland Rd., Bridgton, Maine
- Coordinates: 44°4′50.26″N 70°43′31.46″W
- Built: 1892
- Architect: Frederick A. Tompson
- Architectural style: Queen Anne
- Website: https://walkermemorialhall.org/
- NRHP reference No.: 83003639
- Added to NRHP: December 29, 1983

Walker Memorial Hall is a historic community meeting hall on Highland Road in Bridgton, Maine. Built in 1892 to a design by Frederick A. Tompson, it is a well-preserved local example of eclectic Queen Anne architecture, and continues to be a significant community meeting center, hosting social events and meetings of local organizations. It was listed on the National Register of Historic Places in 1983.

== Description and history ==
Walker Memorial Hall is set in a rural-suburban residential area north of the Bridgton's town center, on the east side of Highland Road north of the golf course. It is a two-story wood-frame structure, with a hip roof and an exterior of clapboard and wooden shingles. The street-facing side of the roof is pierced by wall dormers with false half-timbering, and a three-story tower rises at the southwest corner, topped by an open belfry and pyramidal roof with mini-gables decorated with Stick style woodwork. The main entrance is in the base of the tower, with a small hip-roofed portico projecting to the west.

The hall was built in 1892 with funds bequested to the community by Joseph Walker, a wealthy summer resident of the town. The hall has been used for church services, private parties, dances, and theatrical productions. It was designed by Portland architect Frederick A. Tompson, one of the area's leading architects of the late 19th century.

== See also ==
- National Register of Historic Places listings in Cumberland County, Maine
