= Frederick A. Tompson =

American architect

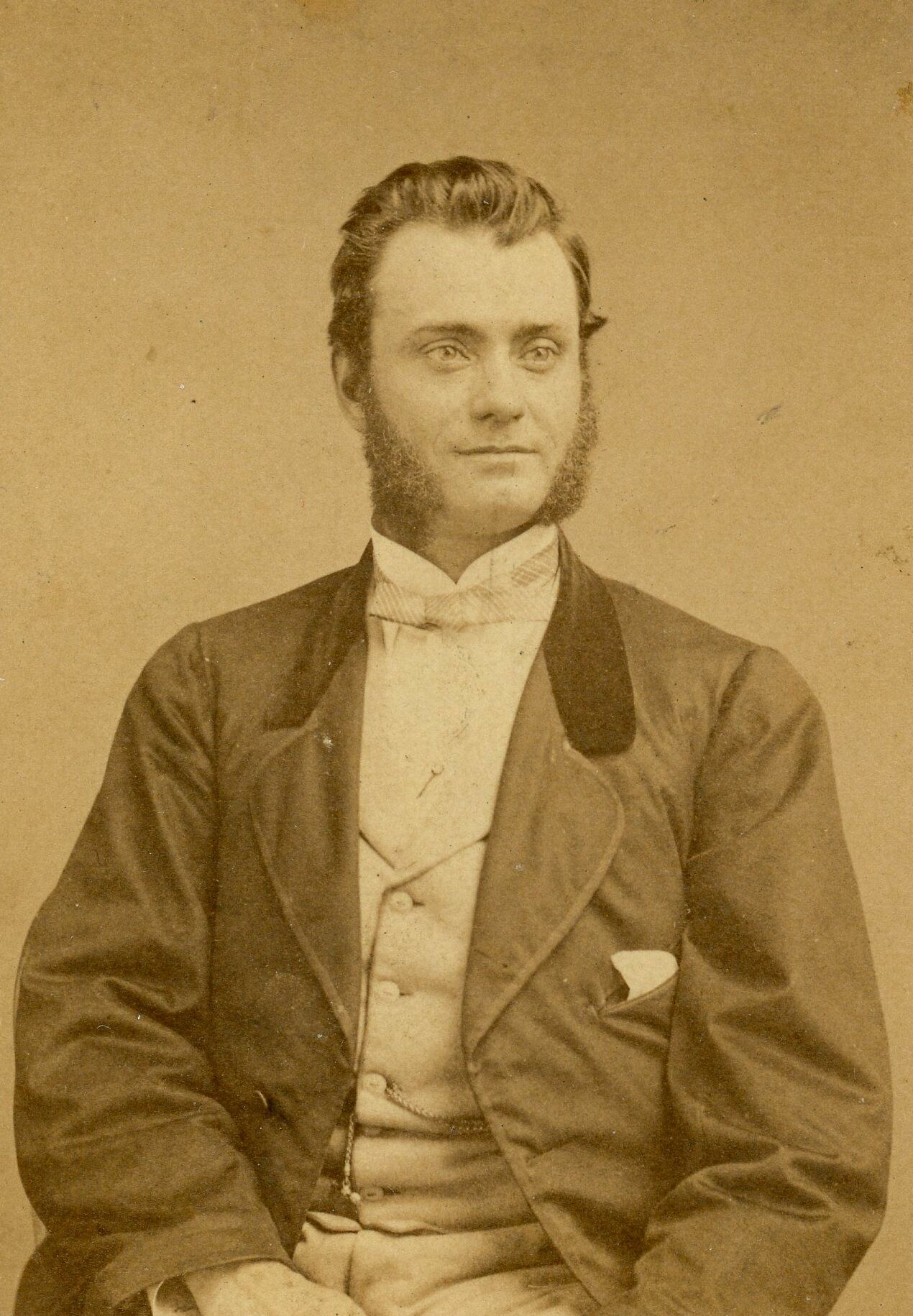
- Frederick A. Tompson, c. 1870s
- Born: August 10, 1857; Portland, Maine, U.S.
- Died: February 2, 1919 (aged 61); Portland, Maine, U.S.
- Occupation: Architect

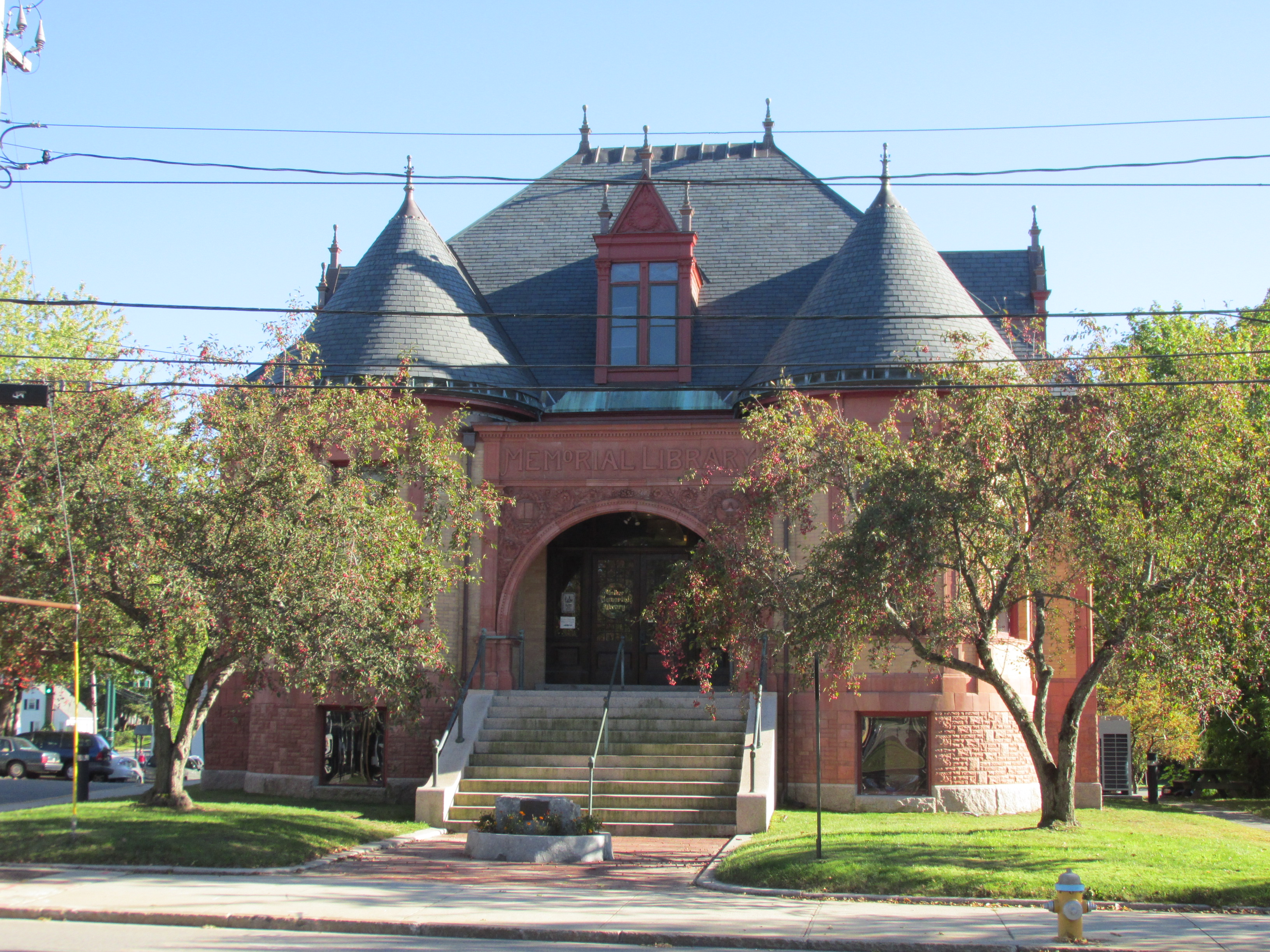
The Walker Memorial Library in Westbrook, built in 1894.

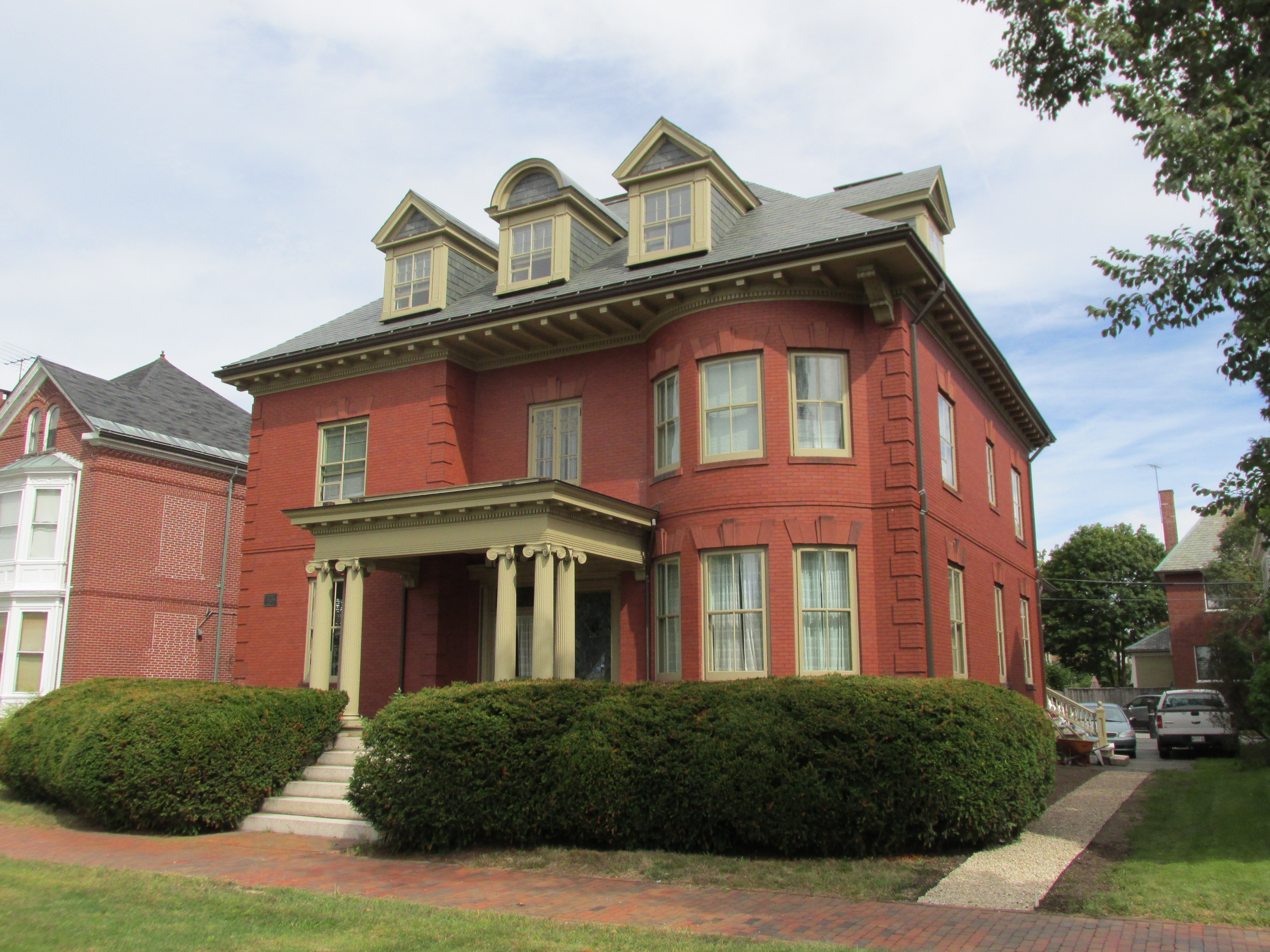
The Adam P. Leighton house in Portland, completed in 1903.

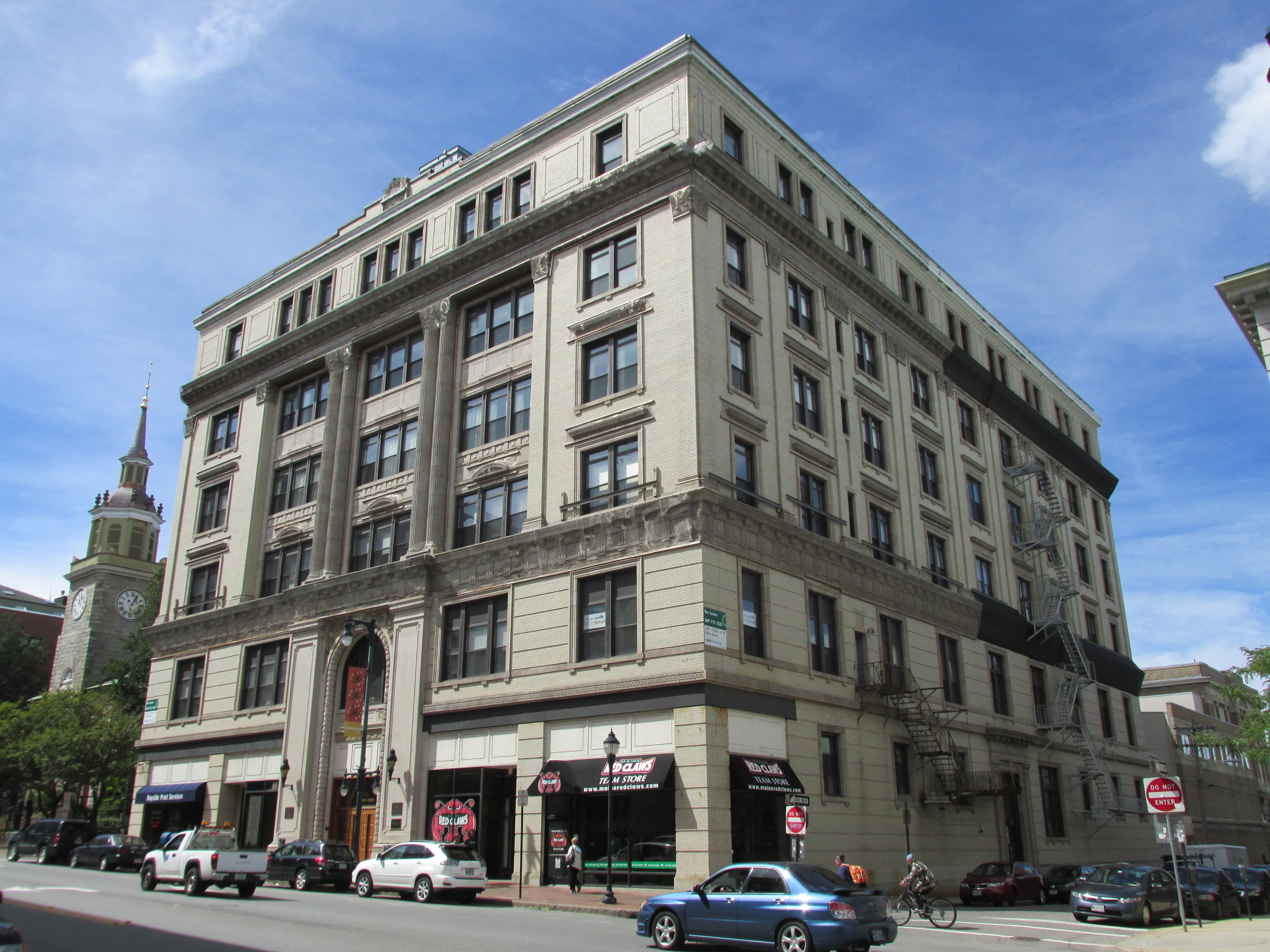
The Masonic Temple in Portland, completed in 1911.

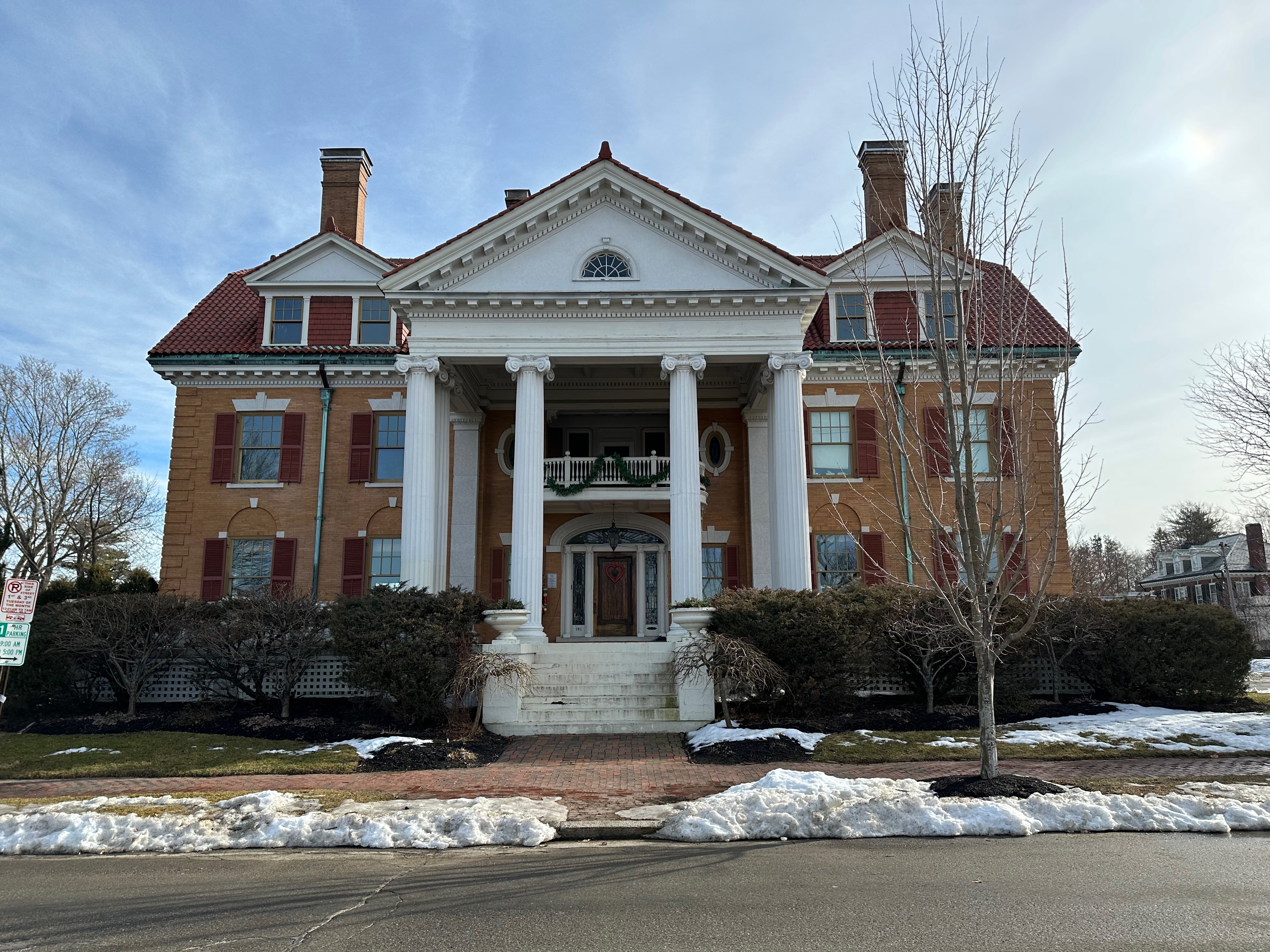
The West Mansion in Portland, built in 1911.

Frederick Augustus Tompson (August 10, 1857 – February 2, 1919) was an American architect from Portland, Maine.

== Life and career ==
Tompson was born in Portland in 1857, to John A. Tompson and Mary Elizabeth Libby. In 1876, after graduating Portland High School, he entered the office of Francis H. Fassett, Maine's most prominent architect at the time. He worked his way up through the office until 1886, when he was promoted to partner in the new office of Fassett & Tompson. That association lasted until the end of 1890, and Tompson opened his own office in January 1891. He remained in private practice until his death.

In 1894, he married Harriet Lane Larrabee. The couple lived at 33 Carroll Street in Portland. Harriet died in 1908, three years after which Tompson married for a second time, to Leontine F. Farrington.

He was elected an Associate of the American Institute of Architects on December 2, 1901.

Tompson's practice was succeeded by Charles O. Poor, Tompson's chief assistant. Later that year Poor formed a partnership with John P. Thomas. Poor died in 1922, and Thomas opened an office under his own name in 1923. He became one of Maine's most successful architects.

== Death ==
Tompson died on February 2, 1919, aged 61. He was interred in Portland's Evergreen Cemetery, alongside his first wife. His second wife remarried after Tompson's death, and was buried beside her third husband in Oregon, Illinois, upon her death in 1921.

His mother survived him by three months. After her death, aged 89, she was interred in Black Point Cemetery in Scarborough, Maine.

== Legacy ==
Tompson was the designer of several of Portland's most prominent turn-of-the-century structures, and his West house of 1911 remains the city's largest private residence. Several of Tompson's works have been placed on the National Register of Historic Places, and several others are contributing properties of listed historic districts.

== Architectural works ==
- Rich Building, (Note: A contributing property to the Portland Waterfront Historic District, NRHP-listed in 1974.) 106 Exchange St, Portland, Maine (1892)
- Walker Memorial Hall, Highland Rd, Bridgton, Maine (1892, NRHP 1983)
- Castle-in-the-Park, Deering Oaks, Portland, Maine (1894)
- Walker Memorial Library, 800 Main St, Westbrook, Maine (1894, NRHP 1980)
- Portland Armory, 20 Milk St, Portland, Maine (1895)
- George Thornton Edwards–Charles Miller double house, 83-7 Highland St, Portland, Maine (1895)
- John W. D. Carter house, (Note: A contributing property to the Western Promenade Historic District, NRHP-listed in 1984.) 384 Spring St, Portland, Maine (1897)
- Emerson School, 13 Emerson St, Portland, Maine (1897)
- Charles O. Haskell house, 52 Neal St., Portland, Maine (1897)
- YMCA Building, 7 Congress Sq, Portland, Maine (1897, demolished)
- Henry P. Cox house, 231 Western Promenade, Portland, Maine (1898)
- Deering High School (former), 552 Stevens Ave, Portland, Maine (1898)
- Howard C. Smith house, 23 Bramhall St, Portland, Maine (1900)
- Union Mutual Life Insurance Building, 120 Exchange St, Portland, Maine (1900)
- Frederick A. Tompson house, 33 Carroll St, Portland, Maine (1901)
- Walker Manual Training School, 45 Casco St, Portland, Maine (1901)
- Everett Chambers, 51 Oak St, Portland, Maine (1902, NRHP 2004)
- Adam P. Leighton house, 261 Western Promenade, Portland, Maine (1902–03, NRHP 1982)
- State Street Entrance, Deering Oaks, Portland, Maine (1902–04)
- Samuel Wilde Memorial Chapel, Evergreen Cemetery, Portland, Maine (1902)
- Colonial Hotel, 179-185 High St, Portland, Maine (1904, demolished)
- Portland Children's Hospital, 68 High St, Portland, Maine (1908, NRHP 2012)
- Trelawny Building, 655 Congress St, Portland, Maine (1909)
- Masonic Temple, 415 Congress St, Portland, Maine (1911, NRHP 1982)
- West Mansion, 181 Western Promenade, Portland, Maine (1911)
- Portland Exposition Building, 239 Park Ave, Portland, Maine (1914)
- Joseph W. Whitney house, 22 Clifford St, Portland, Maine (1916)
