= Star (disambiguation) =

A star is a luminous astronomical object.

Star, The Star or STAR may also refer to:

== Shapes and symbols ==
- Star polygon, a geometric shape with acute points arranged radially
- Star (grapheme) (star symbol), a typographical symbol
- Star (heraldry), star-like shapes used in heraldry
- Star (classification), a rating system for hotels, movies, or other products
- Star (sport badge), on a team uniform, representing titles won

== Arts and entertainment ==
=== Generic terms ===
- Celebrity
  - Movie star, a person famous for performing in films
- Leading actor, or the star of a production

=== Fictional entities ===
- S.T.A.R. Labs, an organization in the DC Comics fictional universe
- Star, the name of Nina’s star companion in the Sprout program block, The Good Night Show and its animated spin-off Nina's World
- Star (Marvel Comics), the name of three fictional characters in Marvel Comics
- Star Butterfly, a character in the Disney animated series Star vs. the Forces of Evil
- Patrick Star, a character in the animated series SpongeBob SquarePants

=== Films ===
- The Star (1949 film), a Russian film
- The Star (1952 film), an American film
- Star! (film), a 1968 American musical
- Star (1982 film), an Indian Hindi film
- Danielle Steel's Star, a 1993 American television film
- Star (2001 film), an Indian Tamil film
- The Star (2002 film), a Russian remake of the 1953 film
- Star (2014 film), a Russian comedy
- Star (2015 film), a Canadian short drama
- The Star (2017 film), an American animated film
- Star (2024 film), an Indian Tamil film

=== Gaming ===
- Star (board game)
- *Star, board game

=== Music ===
==== Albums ====
- Star (2hollis album)
- Star (702 album)
- Star (Belly album)
- StAR (Jan Garbarek album)
- Star (Milky album)
- Star (Murk album)
- Star (Mika Nakashima album)
- Star (Super Junior album)
- Star/Boom Boom, the soundtrack album to the 1982 film Star
- The Star (album), by JO1

==== Songs ====
- "Star" (Brockhampton song)
- "Star" (Bryan Adams song)
- "Star" (Kevin Ayers song)
- "Star" (Earth, Wind & Fire song)
- "Star" (Erasure song)
- "Star" (Extreme song)
- "Star" (Heavy Moss song)
- "Star" (Loona song)
- "Star" (Primal Scream song)
- "Star" (Stealers Wheel song)
- "Star" (Stellar song)
- "Star", by Bazzi from Cosmic
- "Star", by Biddu and Zohaib Hassan from Star/Boom Boom
- "Star", by David Bowie from The Rise and Fall of Ziggy Stardust and the Spiders from Mars
- "Star", by Brotherhood of Man from Images
- "Star", by Stela Cole
- "Star", by Estelle
- "Star", by Joss Stone from Water for Your Soul
- "Star", by Kiki Dee
- "Star", by Rebecca Ferguson from Superwoman
- "Star", by Terri Walker from L.O.V.E
- "Star", by The Crash from Wildlife
- "Star", by The Cult from The Cult
- "Star", by Hellyeah from their eponymous album
- "Star", by The Hollies from Write On
- "Star", by Savoy from Mountains of Time
- "Star", by Silverbullit
- "Star (*)", by Project 86 from Drawing Black Lines
- "The Star" (Mariah Carey song)
- "The Star" (Ross D. Wyllie song)
- "The Star", by Kikki Danielsson from Midnight Sunshine
- "Stars", by PinkPantheress from Fancy That
- "Star", by Iceage from For Love of Grace & the Hereafter

=== Television ===
- Star (TV series), a musical drama series broadcast by Fox
- Star (TVE channel), a Spanish international television channel
- The Star (TV series), a Thai singing competition reality show
- "The Star" (Adventure Time: Fionna and Cake), an episode of the animated series
- "The Star" (Homeland), the season 3 finale of the series
- "The Star" (The Twilight Zone), an episode based on Arthur C. Clarke's short story

=== Writing ===
- Star, a novel by Pamela Anderson
- Star, a novel by Danielle Steel
- "Star" (short story), by Yukio Mishima
- "The Star" (Clarke short story), by Arthur C. Clarke
- "The Star" (Wells short story), by H. G. Wells, written in 1897
- "The Star", a poem by Jane Taylor, the first line of which is "Twinkle, twinkle, little star"

=== Other uses in arts and entertainment ===
- Star (guitar), a guitar body shape
- Star (Disney+), a hub within the Disney+ streaming service for an adult audience
- Star Cinema, a television production and film distributor company in the Philippines
- Star Cinema Circuit, an historic Australian cinema chain, proprietors D. Clifford Theatres
- Star Distribution, a Latin American and Brazilian film distributor
- Star Theatre (disambiguation), several cinemas and theatres
- The Star Performing Arts Centre, Singapore

== Businesses ==
=== Media ===
- Star (newspaper), various newspapers called either Star or The Star
- Star (magazine), an American celebrity tabloid
- St. Austin Review (StAR), a Catholic magazine
- The Star (Bangladesh), a current affairs magazine
- Star, a historical bookseller, founded by Henry Denham in Paternoster Row, London
- List of radio stations named Star; see Star FM (disambiguation)
- Star Comics, an imprint of Marvel Comics (1984–1988)
- Star Film (Dutch East Indies company), a Dutch East Indies former film production company
- Star FM (disambiguation), the name of several radio broadcasters
- Star Magic, a talent agency in the Philippines
- Star Music, a recording company in the Philippines
- Star TV (disambiguation), the name of several TV broadcasters and streaming services

=== Transport companies ===
==== Air ====
- Star Air (disambiguation), several airlines
- Star Airlines, a former name of XL Airways France
- Star Alliance, an alliance of airlines
- Star Aviation, an Algerian airline

==== Land ====
- FSC Star, a Polish truck manufacturer
- Società Torinese Automobili Rapid, an Italian automobile manufacturer from 1904 to 1921
- Star Motor Company, an 1898–1932 British car manufacturer
- Star Motorcycles, a division of Yamaha Motor Corporation, US
- STAR Transit, a transit agency in Texas

==== Sea ====
- Star Cruises, a cruise line
- Star Ferry, a Hong Kong ferryboat service
- Star Line (shipping company), a defunct Irish shipping company

=== Other businesses ===
- STAR (interbank network), the largest American interbank network
- Star Bonifacio Echeverria, a defunct Spanish firearms manufacturer
- Star Entertainment Group, an Australian gambling and entertainment company
  - The Star, Sydney, a casino
  - The Star Gold Coast, a casino and hotel
- STAR Lager, a Nigerian beer brand
- Star Market, a chain of supermarkets based in Boston, US
- Star Micronics, a Japanese printer manufacturer

== Education ==
- California Standardized Testing and Reporting Program, a school assessment program
- New York State School Tax Relief Program, or STAR Program
- Sekolah Tuanku Abdul Rahman, a Malaysian public school

== Law enforcement ==
- Special Tactics and Rescue (Singapore), a division of the Singapore Police Force
- Special Task and Rescue, a division of the Malaysian Maritime Enforcement Agency
- Special Tasks and Rescue, (STAR Group) a police unit of the South Australia police

== Private organizations ==
- Society of Ticket Agents and Retailers, a British organization
- Street Transvestite Action Revolutionaries, a former American organization
- Synagogues: Transformation and Renewal, an American Jewish organisation

== People ==
- Star (name), a list of people with either the given name or surname
- Star, a female professional wrestler from the Gorgeous Ladies of Wrestling
- Star Jr. (born 1994), the ring name of a Mexican professional wrestler
- Zonnique "Star" Pullins, member of the teenage girl group OMG Girlz

== Places ==
=== United Kingdom ===
- Star, Fife, a village in Scotland
- Star, Pembrokeshire, a hamlet in Wales
- Star, Somerset, a hamlet in the civil parish of Shipham, England
- Star, a small settlement near the village of Gaerwen, Wales

=== United States ===
- Star, Idaho, a city
- Star, Munising Township, Michigan, an unincorporated community
- Star, Mississippi, an unincorporated community
- Star, Nebraska, an unincorporated community
- Star, North Carolina, a town
- Star, Texas, an unincorporated community
- Star Island (disambiguation)
- Star Lake (Cook County, Minnesota)
- Star Lake (Otter Tail County, Minnesota), a lake in central Minnesota
- Star Lake (Vilas County, Wisconsin)
- Star Township (disambiguation), various townships
- Star Valley (Wyoming), valley in western Wyoming and eastern Idaho

=== Elsewhere ===
- Star, Alberta, a hamlet in Canada
- Star, Bryansk Oblast, Russia
- Star, Novgorod Oblast, Russia
- Star Mountains, Papua New Guinea
- The Star, Singapore, a shopping mall and performing arts centre in Singapore

== Science and technology ==
=== Biology ===
- STAR (gene), the gene that encodes steroidogenic acute regulatory protein
- Steroidogenic acute regulatory protein (StAR), a transport protein
- Ulmus americana 'Star', an elm cultivar

=== Computing ===
- STAR (software), an educational software series
- Star (Unix), an implementation of the tar file archiver
- Xerox Star, a 1981 computer workstation
- Kleene star, a wildcard symbol used in computer science

=== Mathematics ===
- Star (game theory), a position in combinatorial game theory
- Star (graph theory), a graph with a structure that resembles a star
- Star (simplicial complex), the set of simplices containing a given vertex in a simplicial complex
- Kleene star, which can refer to one of two related unary operations, that can be applied either to an alphabet of symbols or to a formal language, a set of strings (finite sequences of symbols)

=== Other uses in science and technology ===
- STAR detector, a particle physics experiment
- Synthetically thinned aperture radar, an interferometric radar method
- Star Bus, a satellite platform

== Sport ==
- KK Star, a basketball club in Serbia
- Crumlin Star F.C., a football club in Northern Ireland
- Greenwell Star F.C., a football club in Northern Ireland
- Supporters' Trust at Reading, a Reading Football Club supporters' organization
- Manglerud Star Ishockey, a Norwegian hockey team
- Single-Handed Trans-Atlantic Race, a yacht race
- Star (keelboat), a one-design racing keelboat
- The Star (stadium), an indoor stadium in Frisco, Texas

== Transportation ==
=== Aerospace ===
- Standard terminal arrival route, a flight procedure
- Star (rocket stage), a family of American solid-fuel rocket motors

=== Land ===
- Star (automobile), a marque assembled by the Durant Motors Company between 1922 and 1928
- American Star Bicycle, an early type of bicycle
- Southern Tagalog Arterial Road, or STAR Tollway, an expressway in the Philippines
- GWR 4000 Class, or Star, a type of steam locomotive
- GWR Star Class, a type of steam locomotive
- Suburban Transit Access Route, or STAR Line, a defunct rail proposal in Chicago, US

=== Sea ===
- Star (keelboat), a one-design racing keelboat
- HMS Star, several Royal Navy ships
- MS Star (1978), originally Merzario Hispania and later MS Nordic Ferry, a car ferry
- MS Star (2006), a Ro-Pax ferry operated by the Estonian ferry company Tallink
- USS Monticello (1859), a US Navy wooden screw-steamer briefly named Star

== Other uses ==
- Barn star
- Star (Chinese constellation)
- The Star (Ketchikan, Alaska), a historic commercial building in Ketchikan, Alaska
- Star (dog), a dog shot by the New York City Police
- Star, a horse coat facial marking
- An-Najm ("The Star"), the 53rd sura of the Qur'an
- Pyrotechnic star, in fireworks displays
- Situation, task, action, result, an interview technique
- STAR voting (Score Then Automatic Runoff), a cardinal electoral system
- The Star (Tarot card), a Major Arcana tarot card
- Star Scout (Boy Scouts of America), the third-highest rank attainable in the Boy Scouts of America
- HMCS Star, a reserve unit of the Canadian Maritime Command

== See also ==
- * (disambiguation)
- Asterisk, typographical symbol (*), sometimes vocalised as 'star'
- Asterisk (disambiguation)
- Die Sterne (disambiguation)
- Starchild (disambiguation)
- Stardust (disambiguation)
- Starfish (disambiguation)
- Starlight (disambiguation)
- Starman (disambiguation)
- Starr (disambiguation)
- Stars (disambiguation)
- Starz (disambiguation)
- STAAR (STAAR). a standardized test in Texas
