= Star Lake =

Star Lake may refer to:

- Star Lake (Cook County, Minnesota)
- Star Lake (Otter Tail County, Minnesota), a lake in central Minnesota
  - Star Lake Township, Minnesota, a township named for the lake
- Star Lake (St. Lawrence, New York)
  - Star Lake, New York, a hamlet on the lake
- Star Lake (Zhaoqing), a lake in Guangdong Province, China
- Star Lake (Newfoundland), a reservoir in Newfoundland, Canada
- Gwiazda Lake (Star lake in Polish), a ribbon lake in the Pomeranian Voivodeship, Poland
- The Pavilion at Star Lake, an outdoor amphitheater outside Pittsburgh, Pennsylvania
- Star Lake (Washington), a natural lake in Lakeland North, Washington
- Star Lake, Wisconsin, an unincorporated community
  - Star Lake (Vilas County, Wisconsin), a lake in Vilas County
