= Star FM =

Star FM may refer to:

- Star FM (Australia), a former radio network in Australia
- Star FM (Kenya), a Somali-language radio station
- Star FM (Portugal), a defunct Portuguese radio station
- Star FM (Philippines), a radio network in the Philippines
- Star FM (South Africa), a radio station in Klerksdorp, South Africa
- Star FM Zimbabwe, a national radio station in Zimbabwe

== See also ==
- List of radio stations named Star
