= Starchild =

Starchild or Star Child may refer to:

== Music ==
- Starchild (band), a Canadian band
- Starchild (Teena Marie album), 1984
- Starchild (O.C. album), 2005
- "Starchild" (song), a song by Level 42
- "Mothership Connection (Star Child)", a 1976 song by the band Parliament
- "Starchild", a Star One song from the 2003 album Space Metal
- "Starchild", a Wintersun song from the 2004 album Wintersun
- "Starchild", a Freedom Call song from the 2005 album The Circle of Life
- "Starchild", a Jamiroquai song from the 2005 album Dynamite

== Literature ==
- Star Child, a 1998 science fiction novel by James P. Hogan
- Star Child, a novel by Fred Mustard Stewart
- "The Star-Child", a story in the A House of Pomegranates collection by Oscar Wilde
- Starchild Trilogy, a 1960s science fiction trilogy by Frederik Pohl and Jack Williamson
  - Starchild (novel), the second novel in the trilogy

== Folklore and fictional characters ==
- Starchild (comics), a comic book series and character
- Starchild (DC Comics), the adopted daughter of Superman
- The Star Child, the entity main character David Bowman is transformed into at the ending of 2001: A Space Odyssey

== People ==
- Starchild, alter ego of rocker Paul Stanley
- Starchild, alter ego of funk musician Garry Shider (1953–2010)
- Starchild, alter ego of musician Bryndon Cook
- Starchild (activist), libertarian activist and sex worker
- Starchild Abraham Cherrix, a juvenile cancer patient
- Adam Starchild, writer and fraudster

== Companies ==
- Starchild (label), a defunct Japanese record label
- Starchild Productions, a Sydney-based production company

== See also ==
- Starchild skull
