= Creek Street =

Creek Street may refer to:

- Creek Street, Brisbane, Queensland, Australia
- Creek Street (Ketchikan, Alaska), United States
