= Job interview =

Type of interview

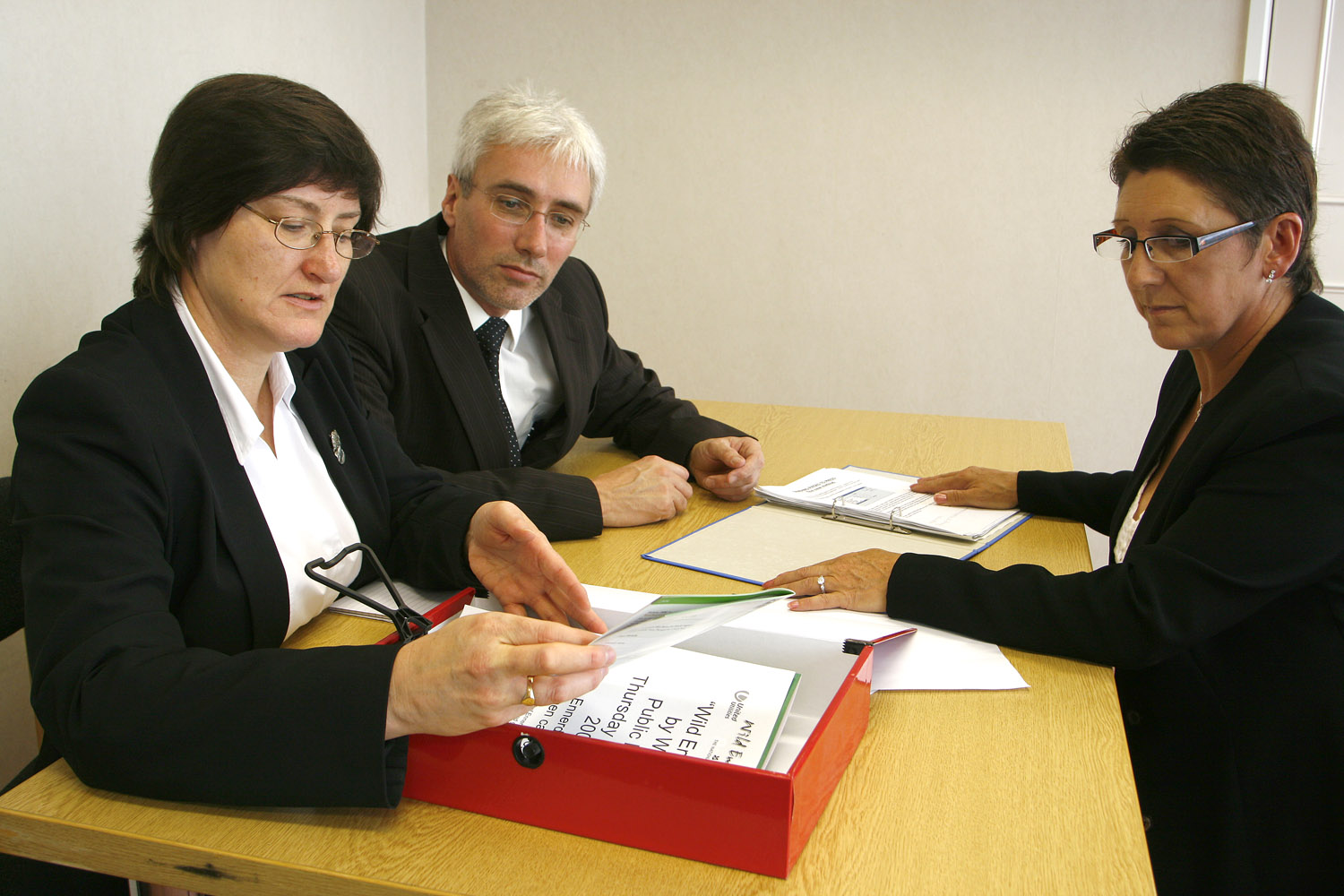
A candidate at a job interview

A job interview is an interview consisting of a conversation between a job applicant and a representative of an employer which is conducted to assess whether the applicant should be hired. Interviews are one of the most common methods of employee selection. Interviews vary in the extent to which the questions are structured, from an unstructured and informal conversation to a structured interview in which an applicant is asked a predetermined list of questions in a specified order; structured interviews are usually more accurate predictors of which applicants will make suitable employees, according to research studies.

A job interview typically precedes the hiring decision. The interview is usually preceded by the evaluation of submitted résumés from interested candidates, possibly by examining job applications or reading many resumes. Next, after this screening, a small number of candidates for interviews is selected.

Potential job interview opportunities also include networking events and career fairs. The job interview is considered one of the most useful tools for evaluating potential employees. It also demands significant resources from the employer, yet has been demonstrated to be notoriously unreliable in identifying the optimal person for the job. An interview also allows the candidate to assess the corporate culture and the job requirements.

Multiple rounds of job interviews and/or other candidate selection methods may be used where there are many candidates or the job is particularly challenging or desirable. Earlier rounds, sometimes called 'screening interviews', may involve fewer staff from the employers and will typically be much shorter and less in-depth. An increasingly common initial interview approach is the telephone interview. This is especially common when the candidates do not live near the employer and has the advantage of keeping costs low for both sides. Since 2003, interviews have been held through video conferencing software, such as Skype. Once all candidates have been interviewed, the employer typically selects the most desirable candidate(s) and begins the negotiation of a job offer.

== Strategies ==
Researchers have attempted to identify interview strategies or "constructs" that can help interviewers choose the best candidate. Research suggests that interviews capture a wide variety of applicant attributes. Constructs can be classified into three categories: job-relevant content, interviewer performance (behavior unrelated to the job but which influences the evaluation), and job-irrelevant interviewer biases.

=== Job-relevant interview content ===
Interview questions are generally designed to tap applicant attributes that are specifically relevant to the job for which the person is applying. The job-relevant applicant attributes that the questions purportedly assess are thought to be necessary for successful performance on the job. The job-relevant constructs that have been assessed in the interview can be classified into three categories: general traits, experiential factors, and core job elements. The first category refers to relatively stable applicant traits. The second category refers to job knowledge that the applicant has acquired over time. The third category refers to the knowledge, skills, and abilities associated with the job.

==== General traits ====
- Mental ability: Applicants' capacity to listen, to communicate, to work with a team, to have attention to detail, and to learn and process information,
- Personality: Conscientiousness, agreeableness, emotional stability, extroversion, openness to new experiences
- Interest, goals, and values: Applicant motives, goals, and person-organization fit

==== Experiential factors ====
- Experience: Job-relevant knowledge derived from prior experience
- Education: Job-relevant knowledge derived from prior education
- Training: Job-relevant knowledge derived from prior training

==== Core job elements ====
- Declarative knowledge: Applicants' learned knowledge
- Procedural skills and abilities: Applicants' ability to complete the tasks required to do the job
- Motivation: Applicants' willingness to exert the effort required to do the job

=== Interviewee performance ===
Interviewer evaluations of applicant responses also tend to be influenced by how an applicant behaves in the interview. These behaviors may not be directly related to the constructs the interview questions were designed to assess, but can be related to aspects of the job for which they are applying. Applicants may subconsciously engage in a number of behaviors that influence ratings of their performance. The applicant may have acquired these behaviors during training or from previous interview experience. These interviewee performance constructs can also be classified into three categories: social effectiveness skills, interpersonal presentation, and personal/contextual factors.

==== Social effectiveness skills ====
- Impression management: Applicants' attempt to make sure the interviewer forms a positive impression of them
- Social skills: Applicants' ability to adapt their behavior according to the demands of the situation to positively influence the interviewer
- Self-monitoring: Applicants' regulation of behaviors to control the image presented to the interviewer
- Relational control: Applicants' attempt to control the flow of the conversation

==== Interpersonal presentation ====
- Verbal expression: Pitch, rate, pauses, tone
- Nonverbal behavior: Gaze, smile, hand movement, body orientation

==== Personal/contextual factors ====
- Interview training: Coaching, mock interviews with feedback
- Interview experience: Number of prior interviews
- Interview self-efficacy: Applicants' perceived ability to do well in the interview
- Interview motivation: Applicants' motivation to succeed in an interview

=== Job-irrelevant interviewer biases ===
The following are personal and demographic characteristics that can potentially influence interviewer evaluations of interviewee responses. These factors are typically not relevant to whether the individual can do the job (that is, not related to job performance), thus, their influence on interview ratings should be minimized or excluded. In fact, there are laws in many countries that prohibit consideration of many of these protected classes of people when making selection decisions. Using structured interviews with multiple interviewers coupled with training may help reduce the effect of the following characteristics on interview ratings. The list of job-irrelevant interviewer biases is presented below.

- Attractiveness: Applicant physical attractiveness can influence the interviewer's evaluation of one's interview performance
- Race: Whites tend to score higher than Blacks and Hispanics; racial similarity between interviewer and applicant, on the other hand, has not been found to influence interview ratings
- Gender: Females tend to receive slightly higher interview scores than their male counterparts; gender similarity does not seem to influence interview ratings
- Similarities in background and attitudes: Interviewers perceived interpersonal attraction was found to influence interview ratings
- Culture: Applicants with an ethnic name and a foreign accent were viewed less favorably than applicants with just an ethnic name and no accent or an applicant with a traditional name with or without an accent

The extent to which ratings of interviewee performance reflect certain constructs varies widely depending on the level of structure of the interview, the kind of questions asked, interviewer or applicant biases, applicant professional dress or nonverbal behavior, and a host of other factors. For example, some research suggests that an applicant's cognitive ability, education, training, and work experiences may be better captured in unstructured interviews, whereas an applicant's job knowledge, organizational fit, interpersonal skills, and applied knowledge may be better captured in a structured interview.

Further, interviews are typically designed to assess a number of constructs. Given the social nature of the interview, applicant responses to interview questions and interviewer evaluations of those responses are sometimes influenced by constructs beyond those the questions were intended to assess, making it extremely difficult to tease out the specific constructs measured during the interview. Reducing the number of constructs the interview is intended to assess may help mitigate this issue. Moreover, of practical importance is whether the interview is a better measure of some constructs in comparison to paper and pencil tests of the same constructs. Indeed, certain constructs (mental ability and skills, experience) may be better measured with paper and pencil tests than during the interview, whereas personality-related constructs seem to be better measured during the interview in comparison to paper and pencil tests of the same personality constructs. In sum, the following is recommended: Interviews should be developed to assess the job-relevant constructs identified in the job analysis.

=== Assessment ===
==== Person-environment fit ====
Person-environment fit is often measured by organizations when hiring new employees. There are many types of Person-environment fit with the two most relevant for interviews being Person-job and Person-organization fit. Interviewers usually emphasize Person-job fit and ask twice as many questions about Person-job fit compared to Person-organization fit. Interviewers are more likely to give applicants with a good Person-job fit a hiring recommendation compared to an applicant with a good Person-organization fit.

An applicant's knowledge, skills, abilities, and other attributes (KSAOs) are the most commonly measured variables when interviewers assess Person-job fit. In one survey, all interviewers reported that their organization measures KSAOs to determine Person-job fit. The same study found that all interviewers used personality traits and 65% of the interviewers used personal values to measure Person-organization fit.

Despite fit being a concern among organizations, how to determine fit and the types of questions to use varies. When interview fit questions were examined, only 4% of the questions used in interviews were similar across the majority of organizations. 22% of questions were commonly used by recruiters in some organizations. In contrast, 74% of the questions had no commonality between organizations. Although the idea of fit is similar in many organizations, the questions used and how that information is judged may be very different.

Person-job fit and Person-organization fit have different levels of importance at different stages of a multi-stage interview process. Despite this, Person-job fit is considered of the highest importance throughout the entire process. Organizations focus more on job-related skills early on to screen out potentially unqualified candidates. Thus, more questions are devoted to Person-job fit during the initial interview stages. Once applicants have passed the initial stages, more questions are used for Person-organization fit in the final interview stages. Although there is more focus on Person-organization fit in these later stages, Person-job fit is still considered to be of greater importance.

In a single-stage interview, both fits are assessed during a single interview. Interviewers still put more weight on Person-job fit questions over the Person-organization questions in these situations as well. Again, Person-job fit questions are used to screen out and reduce the number of applicants.

Potential applicants also use job interviews to assess their fit within an organization. This can determine if an applicant will take a job offer when one is offered. When applicants assess their fit with an organization the experience they have during the job interview is the most influential.

Applicants felt that they had the highest fit with an organization when they could add information not covered during the interview that they wanted to share. Applicants also liked when they could ask questions about the organization, and when they could ask follow-up questions to ensure they answered the interviewer's questions to the level the interviewer wanted. Interviewer behaviors that encourage fit perceptions in applicants include complimenting applicants on their resumes and thanking them for traveling to the interview. Applicants like the interviewer giving contact information if follow-up information is needed, making eye contact, and asking if the applicant was comfortable.

The interviewer can discourage fit perceptions by how they act during an interview as well. The biggest negative behavior for applicants was the interviewer not knowing information about their organization. Without information about the organization, applicants cannot judge how well they fit. Another negative behavior is not knowing applicants' background information during the interview. Interviewers can also hurt fit perception by being inattentive during the interview and not greeting the applicant.

There are some issues with fit perceptions in interviews. Applicants' Person-organization fit scores can be altered by the amount of ingratiation done by the applicants. Interviewers skew their Person-organization fit scores the more ingratiation applicants do during an interview. Applicants emphasizing similarities between them and their interviewers leads to higher Person-organization fit perceptions by the interviewers. This higher perception of fit leads to a greater likelihood of the candidate being hired.

== Process ==
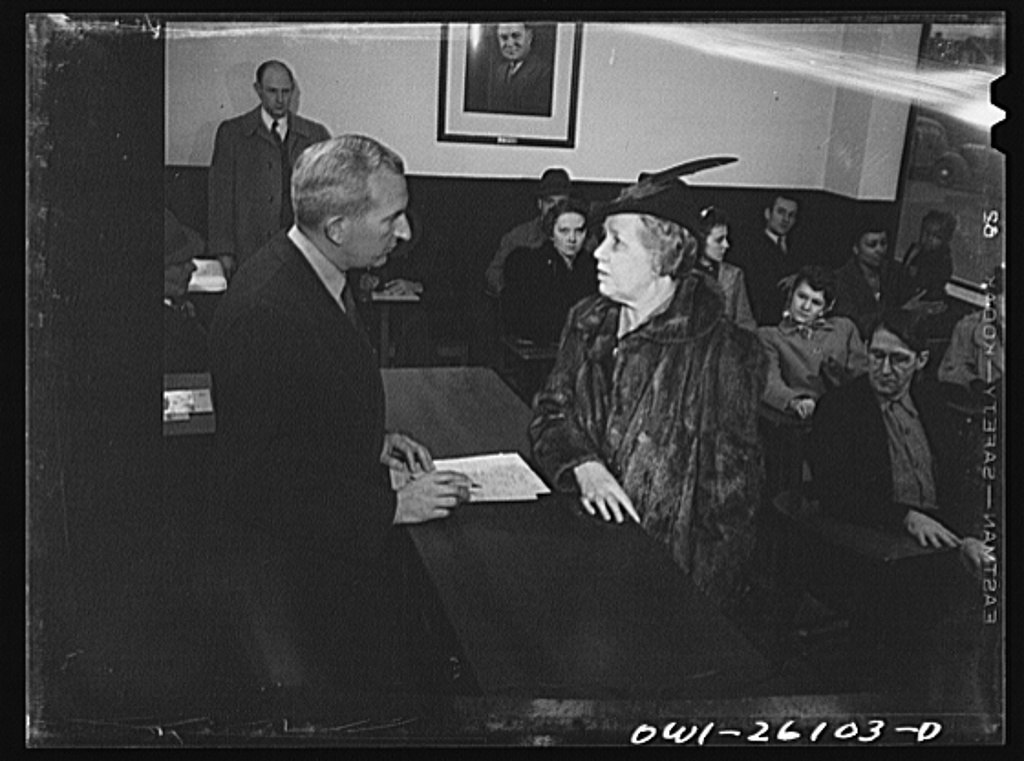
People waiting to be interviewed at an employment agency

One way to think about the interview process is as three separate, albeit related, phases: (1) the pre-interview phase which occurs before the interviewer and candidate meet, (2) the interview phase where the interview is conducted, and (3) the post-interview phase where the interviewer forms judgments of candidate qualifications and makes final decisions. Although separate, these three phases are related. That is, impressions interviewers form early on may affect how they view the person in a later phase.

=== Pre-interview phase ===
The pre-interview phase encompasses the information available to the interviewer beforehand (e.g., resumes, test scores, social networking site information) and the perceptions interviewers form about applicants from this information prior to the actual face-to-face interaction between the two individuals. In this phase, interviewers are likely to already have ideas about the characteristics that would make a person ideal or qualified for the position. Interviewers also have information about the applicant usually in the form of a resume, test scores, or prior contacts with the applicant. Interviewers then often integrate information that they have on an applicant with their ideas about the ideal employee to form a pre-interview evaluation of the candidate. In this way, interviewers typically have an impression even before the actual face-to-face interview interaction. Nowadays with recent technological advancements, interviewers have an even larger amount of information available on some candidates. For example, interviewers can obtain information from search engines (e.g. Google, Bing, Yahoo), blogs, and even social networks (e.g. Linkedin, Facebook, Twitter). While some of this information may be job-related, some of it may not be. In some cases, a review of Facebook may reveal undesirable behaviors such as drunkenness or drug use. Despite the relevance of the information, any information interviewers obtain about the applicant before the interview is likely to influence their impression of the candidate. Furthermore, researchers have found that what interviewers think about the applicant before the interview (pre-interview phase) is related to how they evaluate the candidate after the interview, despite how the candidate may have performed during the interview.

=== Interview phase ===
The interview phase entails the actual conduct of the interview, the interaction between the interviewer and the applicant. Initial interviewer impressions about the applicant before the interview may influence the amount of time an interviewer spends in the interview with the applicant, the interviewer's behavior and questioning of the applicant, and the interviewer's post-interview evaluations. Pre-interview impressions also can affect what the interviewer notices about the interviewee, recalls from the interview, and how an interviewer interprets what the applicant says and does in the interview.

As interviews are typically conducted face-to-face, over the phone, or through video conferencing (e.g. Skype), they are a social interaction between at least two individuals. Thus, the behavior of the interviewer during the interview likely "leaks" information to the interviewee. That is, you can sometimes tell during the interview whether the interviewer thinks positively or negatively about you. Knowing this information can actually affect how the applicant behaves, resulting in a self-fulfilling prophecy effect. For example, interviewees who feel the interviewer does not think they are qualified may be more anxious and feel they need to prove they are qualified. Such anxiety may hamper how well they actually perform and present themselves during the interview, fulfilling the original thoughts of the interviewer. Alternatively, interviewees who perceive an interviewer believes they are qualified for the job may feel more at ease and comfortable during the exchange, and consequently, actually perform better in the interview. Because of the dynamic nature of the interview, the interaction between the behaviors and thoughts of both parties is a continuous process whereby information is processed and informs subsequent behavior, thoughts, and evaluations.

=== Post-interview phase ===
After the interview is conducted, the interviewer must form an evaluation of the interviewee's qualifications for the position. The interviewer most likely takes into consideration all the information, even from the pre-interview phase, and integrates it to form a post-interview evaluation of the applicant. In the final stage of the interview process, the interviewer uses their evaluation of the candidate (i.e., in the interview form ratings or judgment) to make a final decision. Sometimes other selection tools (e.g., work samples, cognitive ability tests, personality tests) are used in combination with the interview to make final hiring decisions; however, interviews remain the most commonly used selection device in North America.

=== For interviewees ===
Although the description of the interview process above focuses on the perspective of the interviewer, job applicants also gather information on the job and/or organization and form impressions prior to the interview. The interview is a two-way exchange and applicants are also making decisions about whether the company is a good fit for them. Essentially, the process model illustrates that the interview is not an isolated interaction, but rather a complex process that begins with two parties forming judgments and gathering information, and ends with a final interviewer decision.

== Types ==
There are many types of interviews that organizations can conduct. What is the same across all interview types, however, is the idea of interview structure. How much an interview is structured, or developed and conducted the same way across all applicants, depends on the number of certain elements included in that interview. Overall, the interview can be standardized both with regard to the content (i.e., what questions are asked) and to the evaluative process (i.e., how the applicants' responses to the questions are scored). When an interview is standardized, it increases the likelihood that an interviewee's ratings are due to the quality of their responses instead of non-job-related and often distracting factors, such as appearance. Interview structure is more appropriately thought to be on a continuum, ranging from completely unstructured to fully structured. However, the structure is often treated as having only two categories (that is, structured vs. unstructured), which many researchers believe to be too simple of an approach.

=== Unstructured ===
The unstructured interview, or one that does not include a good number of standardization elements, is the most common interview form today. Unstructured interviews are typically seen as free-flowing; the interviewer can swap out or change questions at their discretion, and different interviewers may not rate or score applicant responses in the same way. There are also no directions put in place regarding how the interviewer and the interviewee should interact before, during, or after the interview. Unstructured interviews essentially allow the interviewer to conduct the interview however he or she thinks is best.

Given unstructured interviews can change based on who the interviewer might be, it is not surprising that unstructured interviews are typically preferred by interviewers. Interviewers tend to develop confidence in their ability to accurately rate interviewees, detect whether applicants are faking their answers, and trust their judgment about whether the person is a good candidate for the job. Unstructured interviews allow interviewers to do so more freely. Research suggests, however, that unstructured interviews are actually highly unreliable, or inconsistent between interviews. That means that two interviewers who conduct an interview with the same person may not agree and see the candidate the same way even if they were in the same interview with that applicant. Often interviewers who conduct unstructured interviews fail to identify the high-quality candidates for the job.

=== Structured ===
Interview structure is the degree to which interviews are identical and conducted the same across applicants. Also known as guided, systematic, or patterned interviews, these structured formats aim to standardize both the content and the evaluation process. Specifically, researchers commonly identify 15 elements that can be used to make the interview's content and evaluation process similar. An interview's degree of structure is often thought of as the extent to which these elements are included when conducting interviews.

==== Content structure ====
- Ensure questions are relevant to the job, as indicated by a job analysis
- Ask the same questions of all interviewees
- Limit prompting, or follow up questions, that interviewers may ask
- Ask better questions, such as behavioral description questions
- Have a longer interview
- Control ancillary information available to the interviewees, such as resumes
- Do not allow questions from applicants during the interview

==== Evaluation structure ====
- Rate each answer rather than making an overall evaluation at the end of the interview
- Use anchored rating scales (for an example, see BARS)
- Have the interviewer take detailed notes
- Have more than one interviewer view each applicant (i.e. have panel interviews)
- Have the same interviewers rate each applicant
- Do not allow any discussion about the applicants between interviewers
- Train the interviewers
- Use statistical procedures to create an overall interview score

Multiple research studies have shown that using these elements to design the interview increases the interview's ability to identify high-performing individuals. As mentioned, the structure of an interview is on a scale that ranges from unstructured to structured, but it remains unclear which or how many structure elements must be included before the interview can be considered 'structured.' Some researchers argue that including at least some, but not all, elements into the interview should be considered "semi-structured." Others have attempted to create levels of structure, such as Huffcutt, Culbertson, and Weyhrauch's four levels of structure, which point to varying degrees of standardization in each level. Despite being difficult to say exactly what a structured interview is, structured interviews are widely seen as more preferred over unstructured interviews by organizations if an accurate and consistent measure of an applicant is desired.

=== Types of questions ===
Regardless of the interview structure, there are several types of questions interviewers ask applicants. Two major types that are used frequently and that have extensive empirical support are situational questions and behavioral questions (also known as patterned behavioral description interviews). Best practices include basing both types of questions on "critical incidents" that are required to perform the job but they differ in their focus (see below for descriptions). Critical incidents are relevant tasks that are required for the job and can be collected through interviews or surveys with current employees, managers, or subject matter experts. One of the first critical incidents techniques ever used in the United States Army asked combat veterans to report specific incidents of effective or ineffective behavior of a leader. The question posed to veterans was "Describe the officer's actions. What did he do?" Their responses were compiled to create a factual definition or "critical requirements" of what an effective combat leader is.

Previous research has found mixed results regarding whether behavioral or situational questions will best predict the future job performance of an applicant. It is likely that variables unique to each situation, such as the specific criteria being examined, the applicant's work experience, or the interviewee's nonverbal behavior make a difference with regard to which question type is the best. It is recommended to incorporate both situational and behavioral questions into the interview to get the best of both question types. The use of high-quality questions represents an element of structure and is essential to ensure that candidates provide meaningful responses reflective of their capability to perform on the job.

=== Situational interview questions ===
Situational interview questions ask job applicants to imagine a set of circumstances and then indicate how they would respond in that situation; hence, the questions are future-oriented. One advantage of situational questions is that all interviewees respond to the same hypothetical situation rather than describe experiences unique to them from their past. Another advantage is that situational questions allow respondents who have had no direct job experience relevant to a particular question to provide a hypothetical response. Two core aspects of the SI are the development of situational dilemmas that employees encounter on the job, and a scoring guide to evaluate responses to each dilemma.

=== Behavioral interview questions ===
Behavioral (experience-based or patterned behavioral) interviews are past-oriented in that they ask respondents to relate what they did in past jobs or life situations that are relevant to the particular job-relevant knowledge, skills, and abilities required for success. The idea is that past behavior is the best predictor of future performance in similar situations. By asking questions about how job applicants have handled situations in the past that are similar to those they will face on the job, employers can gauge how they might perform in future situations.

Behavioral interview questions include:

- Describe a situation in which you were able to use persuasion to successfully convince someone to see things your way.
- Give me an example of a time when you set a goal and were able to meet or achieve it.
- Tell me about a time when you had to use your presentation skills to influence someone's opinion.
- Give me an example of a time when you had to conform to a policy with which you did not agree.

Examples include the STAR and SOARA techniques.

=== Other types of questions ===
Other possible types of questions that may be asked alongside structured interview questions or in a separate interview include background questions, job knowledge questions, and puzzle-type questions. A brief explanation of each follows.

- Background questions include a focus on work experience, education, and other qualifications. For instance, an interviewer may ask "What experience have you had with direct sales phone calls?" Interviews composed primarily of these types of questions are often labeled "conventional interviews".
- Job knowledge questions may ask candidates to describe or demonstrate knowledge, skills, and abilities (KSAs) relevant to the job. These are typically highly specific questions. For example, one question may be "What steps would you take to conduct a manager training session on safety?"
- The puzzle interview was popularized by Microsoft in the 1990s and is now used in other organizations. The most common types of questions either ask the applicant to solve puzzles or brain teasers (e.g., "Why are manhole covers round?") or to solve unusual problems (e.g., "How would you weigh an airplane without a scale?").

=== Specialized formats ===
==== Case ====
A case interview is an interview form used mostly by management consulting firms and investment banks in which the job applicant is given a question, situation, problem or challenge and asked to resolve the situation. The case problem is often a business situation or a business case that the interviewer has worked on in real life.

In recent years, companies in other sectors like Design, Architecture, Marketing, Advertising, Finance, and Strategy have adopted a similar approach to interviewing candidates. Technology has transformed the Case-based and Technical interview process from a purely private in-person experience to an online exchange of job skills and endorsements.

==== Panel ====
Another type of job interview found throughout the professional and academic ranks is the panel interview. In this type of interview, the candidate is interviewed by a group of panelists representing the various stakeholders in the hiring process. Within this format there are several approaches to conducting the interview. Example formats include;

- Presentation format – The candidate is given a generic topic and asked to make a presentation to the panel. Often used in academic or sales-related interviews.
- Role format – Each panelist is tasked with asking questions related to a specific role of the position. For example, one panelist may ask technical questions, another may ask management questions, another may ask customer service-related questions etc.
- Skeet shoot format – The candidate is given questions from a series of panelists in rapid succession to test his or her ability to handle stress filled situations.

The benefits of the panel approach to interviewing include time savings over serial interviewing, more focused interviews as there is often less time spent building rapport with small talk, and an "apples to apples" comparison because each stakeholder/interviewer/panelist gets to hear the answers to the same questions.

==== Group ====
In the group interview, multiple applicants are interviewed at one time by one or more interviewers. This type of interview can be used for selection, promotion, or assessment of team skills. Interviewers may also use a group interview to assess an applicant's stress management skills or assertiveness because in such a group setting the applicant will be surrounded by other applicants who also want to get the job. Group interviews can be less costly than one-on-one or panel interviews, especially when many applicants need to be interviewed in a short amount of time. In addition, because fewer interviewers are needed, fewer interviewers need to be trained. These positive qualities of the group interview have made them more popular.

Despite the potential benefits to the group interview, there are problems with this interview format. In group interviews, the interviewer has to multitask more than when interviewing one applicant at a time. Interviewers in one-on-one interviews are already busy doing many things. These include attending to what applicants are saying and how they are acting, taking notes, rating applicant responses to questions, and managing what they say and how they act. Interviewing more than one applicant at a time makes it more challenging for the interviewer. This can negatively affect that interviewer and their job as an interviewer. Another problem with group interviews is that applicants who get questioned later in the interview have more of a chance to think about how to answer the questions already asked by the interviewer. This can give applicants questioned later in the interview an advantage over the earlier-questioned applicants. These problems can make it less likely for group interviews to accurately predict who will perform well on the job.

Group interviews have not been studied as much as one-on-one interviews, but the research that has been done suggests that in the field of education group interviews can be an effective method of selection. For example, a 2016 study found that applicants for teaching jobs thought that the group interview was fair. A 2006 study found conflicting findings. These include that applicants in a group interview who were questioned later in the interview gave more complete and higher quality responses and that group interviews were seen as not fair. They also found that group interviews were not as effective as one-on-one interviews. Further research needs to be conducted to more extensively evaluate the group interview's usefulness for various purposes. This research needs to be done across various domains outside of the education sector. Research also needs to clarify conflicting findings by determining in which situations study results can be applied.

==== Stress ====
Stress interviews are still in common use. One type of stress interview is where the employer uses a succession of interviewers (one at a time or en masse) whose mission is to intimidate the candidate and keep him/her off-balance. The ostensible purpose of this interview is to find out how the candidate handles stress. Stress interviews might involve testing an applicant's behavior in a busy environment. Questions about handling work overload, dealing with multiple projects, and handling conflict are typical.

Another type of stress interview may involve only a single interviewer who behaves in an uninterested or hostile manner. For example, the interviewer may not make eye contact, may roll his eyes or sigh at the candidate's answers, interrupt, turn his back, take phone calls during the interview, or ask questions in a demeaning or challenging style. The goal is to assess how the interviewee handles pressure or to purposely evoke emotional responses. This technique was also used in research protocols studying stress and type A (coronary-prone) behavior because it would evoke hostility and even changes in blood pressure and heart rate in study subjects. The key to success for the candidate is to de-personalize the process. The interviewer is acting a role, deliberately and calculatedly trying to "rattle the cage". Once the candidate realizes that there is nothing personal behind the interviewer's approach, it is easier to handle the questions with aplomb.

Example stress interview questions:

- Sticky situation: "If you caught a colleague cheating on his expenses, what would you do?"
- Putting one on the spot: "How do you feel this interview is going?"
- "Popping the balloon": (deep sigh) "Well, if that's the best answer you can give ... " (shakes head) "Okay, what about this one ...?"
- Oddball question: "What would you change about the design of the hockey stick?"
- Doubting one's veracity: "I don't feel like we're getting to the heart of the matter here. Start again – tell me what really makes you tick."

Candidates may also be asked to deliver a presentation as part of the selection process. One stress technique is to tell the applicant that they have 20 minutes to prepare a presentation, and then come back to the room five minutes later and demand that the presentation be given immediately. The "Platform Test" method involves having the candidate make a presentation to both the selection panel and other candidates for the same job. This is obviously highly stressful and is therefore useful as a predictor of how the candidate will perform under similar circumstances on the job. Selection processes in academic, training, airline, legal, and teaching circles frequently involve presentations of this sort.

=== Technical ===
This kind of interview focuses on problem solving and creativity. The questions aim at the interviewee's problem-solving skills and likely show their ability in solving the challenges faced in the job through creativity. Technical interviews are being conducted online at progressive companies before in-person talks as a way to screen job applicants.

==== Technology in interviews ====
Advancements in technology along with increased usage have led to interviews becoming more common through a telephone interview and through videoconferencing than face-to-face. Companies utilize technology in interviews due to its cheap costs, time-saving benefits, and their ease of use.

Also, technology enables a company to recruit more applicants from further away. Although they are being utilized more, it is still not fully understood how technology may affect how well interviewers select the best person for the job when compared to in-person interviews.

Media richness theory states that more detailed forms of communication will be able to better convey complex information. The ability to convey this complexity allows more media-rich forms of communication to better handle uncertainty (like what can occur in an interview) than shallower and less detailed communication mediums. Thus, in the job interview context, a face-to-face interview would be more media-rich than a video interview due to the amount of data that can be more easily communicated. Verbal and nonverbal cues are read more in the moment and in relation to what else is happening in the interview. A video interview may have a lag between the two participants. Poor latency can influence the understanding of verbal and nonverbal behaviors, as small differences in the timing of behaviors can change their perception. Likewise, behaviors such as eye contact may not work as well. A video interview would be more media-rich than a telephone interview due to the inclusion of both visual and audio data. Thus, in a more media-rich interview, interviewers have more ways to gather, remember, and interpret the data they gain about the applicants.

So are these new types of technology interviews better? Research on different interview methods has examined this question using media richness theory. According to the theory, interviews with more richness are expected to result in a better outcome. In general, studies have found results are consistent with media richness theory. Applicants' interview scores and hiring ratings have been found to be worse in phone and video interviews than in face-to-face interviews. Applicants are also seen as less likable and were less likely to be endorsed for jobs in interviews using video. Applicants have had a say too. They think that interviews using technology are less fair and less job-related. From the interviewers' view, there are difficulties for the interviewer as well. Interviewers are seen as less friendly in video interviews. Furthermore, applicants are more likely to accept a job after a face-to-face interview than after a telephone or video interview. Due to these findings, companies should weigh the costs and benefits of using technology over face-to-face interviews when deciding on selection methods.

== Interviewee strategies and behaviors ==
=== Nonverbal behaviors ===
It may not only be what you say in an interview that matters, but also how you say it (e.g., how fast you speak) and how you behave during the interview (e.g., hand gestures, eye contact). In other words, although applicants' responses to interview questions influence interview ratings, their nonverbal behaviors may also affect interviewer judgments. Nonverbal behaviors can be divided into two main categories: vocal cues (e.g., articulation, pitch, fluency, frequency of pauses, speed, etc.) and visual cues (e.g., smiling, eye contact, body orientation and lean, hand movement, posture, etc.). Oftentimes physical attractiveness is included as part of nonverbal behavior as well. There is some debate about how large a role nonverbal behaviors may play in the interview. Some researchers maintain that nonverbal behaviors affect interview ratings a great deal, while others have found that they have a relatively small impact on interview outcomes, especially when considered with applicant qualifications presented in résumés. The relationship between nonverbal behavior and interview outcomes is also stronger in structured interviews than in unstructured interviews, and stronger when interviewees' answers are of high quality.

Applicants' nonverbal behaviors may sway interview ratings through the inferences interviewers make about the applicant based on their behavior. For instance, applicants who engage in positive nonverbal behaviors such as smiling and leaning forward are perceived as more likable, trustworthy, credible, warmer, successful, qualified, motivated, competent, and socially skilled. These applicants are also predicted to be better accepted and more satisfied with the organization if hired.

Applicants' verbal responses and their nonverbal behavior may convey some of the same information about the applicant. However, despite any shared information between content and nonverbal behavior, it is clear that nonverbal behaviors do predict interview ratings to an extent beyond the content of what was said, and thus it is essential that applicants and interviewers alike are aware of their impact. You may want to be careful of what you may be communicating through the nonverbal behaviors you display.

=== Physical attractiveness ===
To hire the best applicants for the job, interviewers form judgments, sometimes using applicants' physical attractiveness. That is, physical attractiveness is usually not necessarily related to how well one can do the job, yet has been found to influence interviewer evaluations and judgments about how suitable an applicant is for the job. Once individuals are categorized as attractive or unattractive, interviewers may have expectations about physically attractive and physically unattractive individuals and then judge applicants based on how well they fit those expectations. As a result, it typically turns out that interviewers will judge attractive individuals more favorably on job-related factors than they judge unattractive individuals. People generally agree on who is and who is not attractive and attractive individuals are judged and treated more positively than unattractive individuals. For example, people who think another is physically attractive tend to have positive initial impressions of that person (even before formally meeting them), perceive the person to be smart, socially competent, and have good social skills and general mental health.

Within the business domain, physically attractive individuals have been shown to have an advantage over unattractive individuals in numerous ways, that include, but are not limited to, perceived job qualifications, hiring recommendations, predicted job success, and compensation levels. As noted by several researchers, attractiveness may not be the most influential determinant of personnel decisions but may be a deciding factor when applicants possess similar levels of qualifications. In addition, attractiveness does not provide an advantage if the applicants in the pool are of high quality, but it does provide an advantage in increased hiring rates and more positive job-related outcomes for attractive individuals when applicant quality is low and average.

Vocal Attractiveness Just as physical attractiveness is a visual cue, vocal attractiveness is an auditory cue and can lead to differing interviewer evaluations in the interview as well. Vocal attractiveness, defined as an appealing mix of speech rate, loudness, pitch, and variability, has been found to be favorably related to interview ratings and job performance. In addition, the personality traits of agreeableness and conscientiousness predict performance more strongly for people with more attractive voices compared to those with less attractive voices.

As important as it is to understand how physical attractiveness can influence the judgments, behaviors, and final decisions of interviewers, finding ways to decrease potential bias in the job interview is equally important. Conducting structured interview with elements is one possible way to decrease bias.

=== Coaching ===
An abundance of information is available to instruct interviewees on strategies for improving their performance in a job interview. Information used by interviewees comes from a variety of sources ranging from popular how-to books to formal coaching programs, sometimes even provided by the hiring organization. Within the more formal coaching programs, there are two general types of coaching. One type of coaching is designed to teach interviewees how to perform better in the interview by focusing on how to behave and present themselves. This type of coaching is focused on improving aspects of the interview that are not necessarily related to the specific elements of performing the job tasks. This type of coaching could include how to dress, how to display nonverbal behaviors (head nods, smiling, eye contact), verbal cues (how fast to speak, speech volume, articulation, pitch), and impression management tactics. Another type of coaching is designed to focus interviewees on the content specifically relevant to describing one's qualifications for the job, in order to help improve their answers to interview questions. This coaching, therefore, focuses on improving the interviewee's understanding of the skills, abilities, and traits the interviewer is attempting to assess, and responding with relevant experience that demonstrates these skills. For example, this type of coaching might teach an interviewee to use the STAR approach for answering behavioral interview questions.

A coaching program might include several sections focusing on various aspects of the interview. It could include a section designed to introduce interviewees to the interview process, and explain how this process works (e.g., administration of interview, interview day logistics, different types of interviews, advantages of structured interviews). It could also include a section designed to provide feedback to help the interviewee to improve their performance in the interview, as well as a section involving practice answering example interview questions. An additional section providing general interview tips about how to behave and present oneself could also be included.

It is useful to consider coaching in the context of the competing goals of the interviewer and interviewee. The interviewee's goal is typically to perform well (i.e. obtain high interview ratings), in order to get hired. On the other hand, the interviewer's goal is to obtain job-relevant information, in order to determine whether the applicant has the skills, abilities, and traits believed by the organization to be indicators of successful job performance. Research has shown that how well an applicant does in the interview can be enhanced with coaching. The effectiveness of coaching is due, in part, to increasing the interviewee's knowledge, which in turn results in better interview performance. Interviewee knowledge refers to knowledge about the interview, such as the types of questions that will be asked, and the content that the interviewer is attempting to assess. Research has also shown that coaching can increase the likelihood that interviewers using a structured interview will accurately choose those individuals who will ultimately be most successful on the job (i.e., increase reliability and validity of the structured interview). Additionally, research has shown that interviewees tend to have positive reactions to coaching, which is often an underlying goal of an interview. Based on research thus far, the effects of coaching tend to be positive for both interviewees and interviewers.

=== Faking ===
Interviewers should be aware that applicants can fake their responses during the job interview. Such applicant faking can influence interview outcomes when present. One concept related to faking is impression management (IM; when you intend or do not intend to influence how favorably you are seen during interactions). Impression management can be either honest or deceptive. Honest IM tactics are used to frankly describe favorable experiences, achievements and job-related abilities. Deceptive IM tactics are used to embellish or create an ideal image for the job in question. Honest IM tactics such as self-promotion (positively highlighting past achievements and experiences) may be considered necessary by interviewers in the interview context. Consequently, candidates who do not use these tactics may be viewed as disinterested in the job. This can lead to less favorable ratings. Faking can then be defined as "deceptive impression management or the intentional distortion of answers in the interview in order to get better interview ratings and/or otherwise create favorable perceptions". Thus, faking in the employment interview is intentional, deceptive, and aimed at improving perceptions of performance.

Faking in the employment interview can be broken down into four elements:

1. The first involves the interviewee portraying themself as an ideal job candidate by exaggerating true skills, tailoring answers to better fit the job, and/or creating the impression that personal beliefs, values, and attitudes are similar to those of the organization.
2. The second aspect of faking is inventing or completely fabricating one's image by piecing distinct work experiences together to create better answers, inventing untrue experiences or skills, and portraying others' experiences or accomplishments as one's own.
3. Thirdly, faking might also be aimed at protecting the applicant's image. This can be accomplished through omitting certain negative experiences, concealing negatively perceived aspects of the applicant's background, and by separating oneself from negative experiences.
4. The fourth and final component of faking involves ingratiating oneself to the interviewer by conforming personal opinions to align with those of the organization, as well as insincerely praising or complimenting the interviewer or organization.

Of all of the various faking behaviors listed, ingratiation tactics were found to be the most prevalent in the employment interview, while flat out making up answers or claiming others' experiences as one's own is the least common. However, fabricating true skills appears to be at least somewhat prevalent in employment interviews. One study found that over 80% of participants lied about job-related skills in the interview, presumably to compensate for a lack of job-required skills/traits and further their chances for employment.

Most importantly, faking behaviors have been shown to affect the outcomes of employment interviews. For example, the probability of getting another interview or job offer increases when interviewees make up answers.

Different interview characteristics also seem to impact the likelihood of faking. Faking behavior is less prevalent, for instance, in past behavioral interviews than in situational interviews, although follow-up questions increased faking behaviors in both types of interviews. Therefore, if practitioners are interested in decreasing faking behaviors among job candidates in employment interview settings, they should utilize structured, past behavioral interviews and avoid the use of probes or follow-up questions.

== Factors impacting effectiveness ==
=== Interviewee characteristics ===
Interviewees may differ on any number of dimensions commonly assessed by job interviews and evidence suggests that these differences affect interview ratings. Many interviews are designed to measure some specific differences between applicants, or individual difference variables, such as Knowledge, Skills, and Abilities needed to do the job well. Other individual differences can affect how interviewers rate the applicants even if that characteristic is not meant to be assessed by the interview questions. For instance, General Mental Ability G factor (psychometrics) is moderately related to structured interview ratings and strongly related to structured interviews using behavioral description and situational judgment interview questions, because they are more cognitively intensive interview types. Other individual differences between people, such as extraversion and emotional intelligence, are also commonly measured during a job interview because they are related to verbal ability, which may be useful for jobs that involve interacting with people.

Many individual difference variables may be linked to interview performance because they reflect applicants' genuine ability to perform better in cognitively and socially demanding situations. For instance, someone with high general mental ability may perform better in a cognitively demanding situation, such as a job interview, which requires quick thinking and responding. Similarly, someone with strong social skills may perform better in a job interview, as well as in other social situations, because they understand how to act correctly. Thus, when an applicant performs well in an interview due to higher general mental abilities or better social skills, it is not necessarily undesirable, because they may also perform better when they are faced with situations on the job in which those skills would be valuable.

On the other hand, not all individual difference variables that lead to higher interview performance would be desirable on the job. Some individual difference variables, such as those that are part of the dark triad, can lead to increased interview ratings, initially, but may not be reflective of actual KSAOs that would help the individual to perform better once hired.

==== The Dark Triad ====
===== Machiavellianism =====
Individuals who are high in Machiavellianism may be more willing and more skilled at faking and less likely to give honest answers during interviews. Individuals high in Machiavellianism have stronger intentions to use faking in interviews compared to psychopaths or narcissists and are also more likely to see the use of faking in interviews as fair. Men and women high in Machiavellianism may use different tactics to influence interviewers. In one study, which examined how much applicants allowed the interviewers to direct the topics covered during the interview, women high in Machiavellianism tended to allow interviewers more freedom to direct the content of the interview. Men high in Machiavellianism, on the other hand, gave interviewers the least amount of freedom in directing the content of the interview. Men high in Machiavellianism were also more likely to make up information about themselves or their experiences during job interviews. Thus, while individuals high in Machiavellianism may appear to do well in interviews, this seems to be largely because they give untrue responses and because they want to control interpersonal interactions.

===== Narcissism =====
Narcissists typically perform well at job interviews, with narcissists receiving more favorable hiring ratings from interviewers than individuals who are not narcissists. Even more experienced and trained raters evaluate narcissists more favorably. This is perhaps because interviews are one of the few social situations where narcissistic behaviors, such as boasting actually create a positive impression, though favorable impressions of narcissists are often short-lived. Interviewers' initial impressions of narcissistic applicants are formed primarily on the basis of highly visible cues, which makes them susceptible to biases. Narcissists are more skilled at displaying likable cues, which lead to more positive first impressions, regardless of their long-term likability or job performance. Upon first meeting narcissists, people often rate them as more agreeable, competent, open, entertaining, and well-adjusted. Narcissists also tend to be neater and flashier dressers, display friendlier facial expressions, and exhibit more self-assured body movements. Importantly, while narcissistic individuals may rate their own job performance more favorably, studies show that narcissism is not related to job performance.

Thus, while narcissists may seem to perform better and even be rated as performing better in interviews, these more favorable interview ratings are not predictive of favorable job performance, as narcissists do not actually perform better in their jobs than non-narcissists.

===== Psychopathy =====
Corporate psychopaths are readily recruited into organizations because they make a distinctly positive impression at interviews. They appear to be alert, friendly, and easy to get along with and talk to. They look like they are of good ability, emotionally well adjusted and reasonable, and these traits make them attractive to those in charge of hiring staff within organizations. Unlike narcissists, psychopaths are better able to create long-lasting favorable first impressions, though people may still eventually see through their facades. Psychopaths' undesirable personality traits may be easily misperceived by even skilled interviewers. For instance, their irresponsibility may be misconstrued by interviewers as risk-taking or entrepreneurial spirit. Their thrill-seeking tendencies may be conveyed as high energy and enthusiasm for the job or work. Their superficial charm may be misinterpreted by interviewers as charisma. It is worth noting that psychopaths are not only accomplished liars, but they are also more likely to lie in interviews. For instance, psychopaths may create fictitious work experiences or resumes. They may also fabricate credentials such as diplomas, certifications, or awards. Thus, in addition to seeming competent and likable in interviews, psychopaths are also more likely to outright make up information during interviews than non-psychopaths.

=== Interviewer characteristics ===
There are many differences among interviewers that may affect how well they conduct an interview and make decisions about applicants. A few of them are how much experience they have as an interviewer, their personality, and intelligence. To date, it is not clear how experience affects the results of interviews. In some cases, prior experience as an interviewer leads them to use more of the information provided by the applicant to decide if an applicant is right for the job intelligence. In other cases, the experience of the interviewer did not help them make more accurate decisions. One reason for the different results could be the type of experience the interviewer had. Also, other differences in the interviewer, such as personality or intelligence, could be a reason why results vary.

The mental ability of interviewers may play a role in how good they are as interviewers. Higher mental ability is important because, during the interview, a lot of information needs to be processed – what the applicant said, what they meant, what it means for how they can do the job, etc. Research has shown that those higher in general mental ability were more accurate when judging the personality of others. Also, interviewers who have higher social intelligence and emotional intelligence seem to do a better job of understanding how an applicant behaves in an interview and what that means for how they will act once on the job. These abilities do not appear to be enough on their own to make accurate judgments.

The personality of the interviewer may also affect the ratings they give applicants. There are many ways that personality and social skills can impact one's ability to be a good judge or interviewer. Some of the specific social skills good judges display are warmth, interest in engaging with others, and eye contact. Interviewers who display warm behaviors, such as smiling and leaning toward the applicant, are rated more positively than those who do not act this way or show cold behaviors. Interviewers who prefer to engage with others also tend to judge applicants more accurately. It is likely that these people are using information from their own personalities as well as how they see people in general to help them be more accurate.

=== Validity and predictive power ===
There is extant data which puts into question the value of job interviews as a tool for selecting employees. Where the aim of a job interview is ostensibly to choose a candidate who will perform well in the job role, other methods of selection provide greater predictive power and often lower costs.

==== Interview structure issues ====
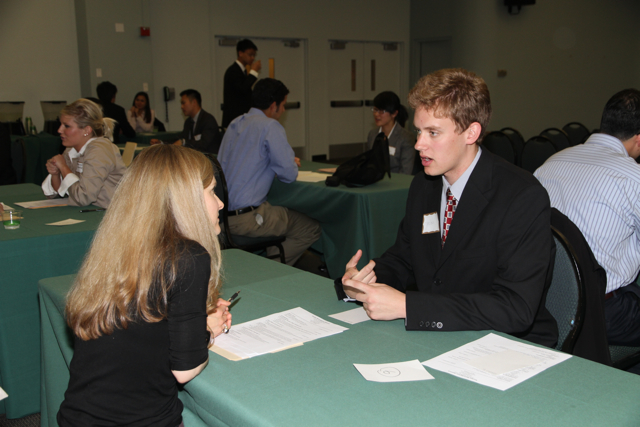
An interview at a job fair

As discussed previously, interviews with more structure are considered best practice, as they tend to result in much better decisions about who will be a good performing employee than interviews with less structure. Structure in an interview can be compared to the standardization of a typical paper and pencil test: It would be considered unfair if every test taker were given different questions and a different number of questions on an exam, or if their answers were each graded differently. Yet this is exactly what occurs in an unstructured interview; interviewers decide the number and content of questions, rate responses using whatever strategy they want (e.g., relying on intuition, or using overall ratings at the end of the interview rather than after each time the applicant responds), and may score some applicants more harshly than others. Thus, interviewers who do not consider at least a moderate amount of structure may make it hard for an organization's interview to effectively select candidates that best fit the work needs of the organization.

==== Interviewer rating reliability ====
In terms of reliability, meta-analytic results provided evidence that interviews can have acceptable levels of interrater reliability, or consistent ratings across interviewers interrater reliability (i.e. .75 or above), when a structured panel interview is used. In terms of criterion-related validity, or how well the interview predicts later job performance criterion validity, meta-analytic results have shown that when compared to unstructured interviews, structured interviews have higher validities, with values ranging from .20-.57 (on a scale from 0 to 1), with validity coefficients increasing with higher degrees of structure. That is, as the degree of structure in an interview increases, the more likely interviewers can successfully predict how well the person will do on the job, especially when compared to unstructured interviews. In fact, one structured interview that included a) a predetermined set of questions that interviewers were able to choose from, and b) interviewer scoring of applicant answers after each individual question using previously created benchmark answers, showed validity levels comparable to cognitive ability tests (traditionally one of the best predictors of job performance) for entry-level jobs.

Honesty and integrity are attributes that can be very hard to determine using a formal job interview process: the competitive environment of the job interview may in fact promote dishonesty. Some experts on job interviews express a degree of cynicism towards the process.

=== Applicant reactions ===
Applicant reactions to the interview process include specific factors such as; fairness, emotional responses, and attitudes toward the interviewer or the organization. Though the applicant's perception of the interview process may not influence the interviewer(s) ability to distinguish between individuals' suitability, applicants reactions are important as those who react negatively to the selection process are more likely to withdraw from the selection process. They are less likely to accept a job offer, apply on future occasions, or to speak highly of the organization to others and to be a customer of that business. Compared to other selection methods, such as personality or cognitive ability tests, applicants, from different cultures may have positive opinions about interviews.

==== Interview design ====
Interview design can influence applicants' positive and negative reactions, though research findings on applicants preferences for structured compared to unstructured interviews appear contradictory. Applicants' negative reactions to structured interviews may be reduced by providing information about the job and organization. Providing interview questions to applicants before the interview, or telling them how their answers will be evaluated, are also received positively.

==== Types of questions ====
The type of questions asked can affect applicant reactions. General questions are viewed more positively than situational or behavioral questions and 'puzzle' interview questions may be perceived as negative being perceived unrelated to the job, unfair, or unclear how to answer. Using questions that discriminate unfairly in law unsurprisingly are viewed negatively with applicants less likely to accept a job offer, or to recommend the organization to others.

Some of the questions and concerns on the mind of the hiring manager include:

- Does this person have the skills I need to get the job done?
- Will they fit in with the department or team?
- Can I manage this person?
- Does this person demonstrate honesty, integrity, and a good work ethic?
- What motivates this person?
- Do I like this person, and do they get along with others?
- Will they focus on tasks and stick to the job until it is done?
- Will this person perform up to the level the company requires for success?

A sample of intention behind questions asked for understanding observable responses, displayed character, and underlying motivation:

- What did the candidate really do in this job?
- What role did they play, supportive or leading?
- How much influence did the candidate exert on the outcomes of projects?
- How did the candidate handle problems that came up?
- How does this candidate come across?
- How serious is the candidate about their career and this job?
- Are they bright and likable?
- Did the candidate prepare for this interview?
- Is the candidate being forthright with information?
- Does this person communicate well in a somewhat stressful face-to-face conversation?
- Does the candidate stay focused on the question asked or ramble along?
- Did the candidate exhibit good judgment in the career moves he or she made?
- Did the candidate grow in their job and take on more responsibilities over time or merely do the same thing repeatedly?
- Did the candidate demonstrate leadership, integrity, effective communications, teamwork, and persuasion skills (among others)?

==== Additional factors ====
The 'friendliness' of the interviewer may be equated to fairness of the process and improve the likelihood of accepting a job offer, and face-to-face interviews compared to video conferencing and telephone interviews. In video conferencing interviews the perception of the interviewer may be viewed as less personable, trustworthy, and competent.

=== Interview anxiety ===
Interview anxiety refers to having unpleasant feelings before or during a job interview. It also reflects the fear of partaking in an interview. Job candidates may feel this increased sense of anxiety because they have little to no control over the interview process. It could also be because they have to speak with a stranger. Due to this fear, anxious candidates display certain behaviors or traits that signal to the interviewer that they are anxious. Examples of such behaviors include frequent pauses, speaking more slowly than usual, and biting or licking of lips.

Research has identified five dimensions of interview anxiety: communication anxiety, social anxiety, performance anxiety, behavioral anxiety and appearance anxiety. Further research shows that both the interviewer and applicant agree that speaking slowly is a clear sign of interview anxiety. However, they do not agree on other anxiety indicators such as frequent pauses and biting or licking of lips. Trait judgments are also related to interview anxiety and can affect interviewer perceptions of anxiety. Low assertiveness has been identified as the key trait related to interview anxiety. Thus, the most important indicators of interview anxiety are slow speech rate and low assertiveness.

Another issue in interview anxiety is gender differences. Although females report being more anxious than males in interviews, their anxiety is not as readily detected as that for males. This can be explained by the Sex-Linked Anxiety Coping Theory (SCT). This theory suggests that females cope better than males when they are anxious in interviews.

==== Implications for applicants ====
Whether anxieties come from individual differences or from the interview setting, they have important costs for job candidates. These include: limiting effective communication and display of future potential, reducing interview performance and evaluation despite potential fit for the job, and reducing the chance of a second interview compared to less anxious individuals. Speaking slowly and low assertiveness have the strongest negative impact on perceptions of interview anxiety. Thus, candidates who experience anxiety in interviews should try to display assertive behaviors such as being dominant, professional, optimistic, attentive and confident In addition, they should speak at a consistent pace that is not unusually slow.

==== Implications for organizations ====
Applicants who view the selection process more favorably tend to be more positive about the organization, and are likely to influence an organization's reputation. whereas, in contrast, anxious or uncomfortable during their interview may view an organization less favorably, causing the otherwise qualified candidates not accepting a job offer. If an applicant is nervous, they might not act the same way they would on the job, making it harder for organizations to use the interview for predicting someone's future job performance.

== Legal issues ==
In many countries laws are put into place to prevent organizations from engaging in discriminatory practices against protected classes when selecting individuals for jobs. In the United States, it is unlawful for private employers with 15 or more employees along with state and local government employers to discriminate against applicants based on the following: race, color, sex (including pregnancy), national origin, age (40 or over), disability, or genetic information (note: additional classes may be protected depending on state or local law). More specifically, an employer cannot legally "fail or refuse to hire or to discharge any individual, or otherwise discriminate against any individual with respect to his compensation, terms, conditions, or privilege of employment" or "to limit, segregate, or classify his employees or applicants for employment in any way which would deprive or tend to deprive any individual of employment opportunities or otherwise adversely affect his status as an employee."

The Civil Rights Act of 1964 and 1991 (Title VII) were passed into law to prevent the discrimination of individuals due to race, color, religion, sex, or national origin. The Pregnancy Discrimination Act was added as an amendment and protects women if they are pregnant or have a pregnancy-related condition.

The Age Discrimination in Employment Act of 1967 prohibits discriminatory practice directed against individuals who are 40 years of age and older. Although some states (e.g. New York) do have laws preventing the discrimination of individuals younger than 40, no federal law exists.

The Americans with Disabilities Act of 1990 protects qualified individuals who currently have or in the past have had a physical or mental disability (current users of illegal drugs are not covered under this Act). A person is covered if he has a disability that substantially limits a major life activity, has a history of a disability, is regarded by others as being disabled, or has a physical or mental impairment that is not transitory (lasting or expected to last six months or less) and minor. In order to be covered under this Act, the individual must be qualified for the job. A qualified individual is "an individual with a disability who, with or without reasonable accommodation, can perform the essential functions of the employment position that such individual holds or desires." Unless the disability poses an "undue hardship," reasonable accommodations must be made by the organization. "In general, an accommodation is any change in the work environment or in the way things are customarily done that enables an individual with a disability to enjoy equal employment opportunities." Examples of reasonable accommodations are changing the workspace of an individual in a wheelchair to make it more wheelchair accessible, modifying work schedules, and/or modifying equipment. Employees are responsible for asking for accommodations to be made by their employer.

The most recent law to be passed is Title II of the Genetic Information Nondiscrimination Act of 2008. In essence, this law prohibits the discrimination of employees or applicants due to an individual's genetic information and family medical history information.

In rare circumstances, it is lawful for employers to base hiring decisions on protected class information if it is considered a Bona Fide Occupational Qualification, that is, if it is a "qualification reasonably necessary to the normal operation of the particular business." For example, a movie studio may base a hiring decision on age if the actor they are hiring will play a youthful character in a film.

Given these laws, organizations are limited in the types of questions they legally are allowed to ask applicants in a job interview. Asking these questions may cause discrimination against protected classes, unless the information is considered a Bona Fide Occupational Qualification. For example, in the majority of situations it is illegal to ask in the USA (and some other countries) the following questions in an interview as a condition of employment:

- What is your date of birth?
- Have you ever been arrested for a crime?
- Do you have any future plans for marriage and children?
- What are your spiritual beliefs?
- How many days were you sick last year? Have you ever been treated for mental health problems?
- What prescription drugs are you currently taking?

=== Applicants with disabilities ===
Applicants with disabilities may be concerned with the effect that their disability has on both interview and employment outcomes. Research has concentrated on four key issues: how interviewers rate applicants with disabilities, the reactions of applicants with disabilities to the interview, the effects of disclosing a disability during the interview, and the perceptions different kinds of applicant disabilities may have on interviewer ratings.

The job interview is a tool used to measure constructs or overall characteristics that are relevant for the job. Oftentimes, applicants will receive a score based on their performance during the interview. Research has found different findings based on interviewers' perceptions of the disability. For example, some research has found a leniency effect (i.e., applicants with disabilities receive higher ratings than equally qualified non-disabled applicants) in ratings of applicants with disabilities Other research, however, has found there is a disconnect between the interview score and the hiring recommendation for applicants with disabilities. That is, even though applicants with disabilities may have received a high interview score, they are still not recommended for employment. The difference between ratings and hiring could be detrimental to a company because they may be missing an opportunity to hire a qualified applicant.

A second issue in interview research deals with the applicants' with disabilities reactions to the interview and applicant perceptions of the interviewers. Applicants with disabilities and able-bodied applicants report similar feelings of anxiety towards an interview. Applicants with disabilities often report that interviewers react nervously and insecurely, which leads such applicants to experience anxiety and tension themselves. The interview is felt to be the part of the selection process where covert discrimination against applicants with disabilities can occur. Many applicants with disabilities feel they cannot disclose (i.e., inform potential employer of disability) or discuss their disability because they want to demonstrate their abilities. If the disability is visible, then disclosure will inevitably occur when the applicant meets the interviewer, so the applicant can decide if they want to discuss their disability. If an applicant has a non-visible disability, however, then that applicant has more of a choice in disclosing and discussing. In addition, applicants who were aware that the recruiting employer already had employed people with disabilities felt they had a more positive interview experience. Applicants should consider if they are comfortable with talking about and answering questions about their disability before deciding how to approach the interview.

Research has also demonstrated that different types of disabilities have different effects on interview outcomes. Disabilities with a negative stigma and that are perceived as resulting from the actions of the person (e.g., HIV-Positive, substance abuse) result in lower interview scores than disabilities for which the causes are perceived to be out of the individual's control (e.g., physical birth defect). A physical disability often results in higher interviewer ratings than psychological (e.g., mental illness) or sensory conditions (e.g., Tourette Syndrome). In addition, there are differences between the effects of disclosing disabilities that are visible (e.g., using a wheelchair) and non-visible (e.g., Epilepsy) during the interview. When applicants had a non-visible disability and disclosed their disability early in the interview they were not rated more negatively than applicants who did not disclose. In fact, they were liked more than the applicants who did not disclose their disability and were presumed not disabled. Interviewers tend to be impressed by the honesty of the disclosure. Strong caution needs to be taken with applying results from studies about specific disabilities, as these results may not apply to other types of disabilities. Not all disabilities are the same and more research is needed to find whether these results are relevant for other types of disabilities.

Some practical implications for job interviews for applicants with disabilities include research findings that show there are no differences in interviewer responses to a brief, shorter discussion or a detailed, longer discussion about the disability during the interview. Applicants, however, should note that when a non-visible disability is disclosed near the end of the interview, applicants were rated more negatively than early disclosing and non-disclosing applicants. Therefore, it is possible that interviewers feel individuals who delay disclosure may do so out of shame or embarrassment. In addition, if the disability is disclosed after being hired, employers may feel deceived by the new hire and reactions could be less positive than would have been in the interview. If applicants want to disclose their disability during the interview, research shows that a disclosure and/or discussion earlier in the interview approach may afford them some positive interview effects. The positive effects, however, are preceded by the interviewers perception of the applicants' psychological well-being. That is, when the interviewer perceives the applicant is psychologically well and/or comfortable with his or her disability, there can be positive interviewer effects. In contrast, if the interviewer perceives the applicant as uncomfortable or anxious discussing the disability, this may either fail to garner positive effect or result in more negative interview ratings for the candidate. Caution must again be taken when applying these research findings to other types of disabilities not investigated in the studies discussed above. There are many factors that can influence the interview of an applicant with a disability, such as whether the disability is physical or psychological, visible or non-visible, or whether the applicant is perceived as responsible for the disability or not. Therefore, applicants should make their own conclusions about how to proceed in the interview after comparing their situations with those examined in the research discussed here.

=== Applicants with criminal backgrounds ===
Although it is illegal for employers to ask about applicants' arrest record during an interview as a deciding factor in applicant hiring decisions, employers do have the right to obtain information about applicants' criminal convictions before hiring, including during the interview phase. Many companies consider hiring applicants with criminal history a liability. For instance, if a company hired someone with an assault charge and that person later assaulted another employee or vendor, some people would say that the company was liable or legally responsible for not maintaining a safe work environment. Although the legalities are more complex, this potential responsibility an organization may carry often is a reason why many companies conduct criminal background checks. When making hiring decisions that somewhat depend on one's criminal background, employers must consider the following:

- Employers should only ask about an applicant's criminal conviction history if it is job related.
- Treating job applicants with criminal histories differently based on their race or national origin is a disparate treatment liability. Disparate treatment is defined as intentional discrimination If employers ask about criminal convictions in the interview process, the interviewer must ask all interviewees and not just interviewees of a perceived sex, race, or national origin.
- Excluding applicants with certain criminal records may end up overly excluding groups of individuals protected under Title VII which is a disparate impact liability. Disparate impact is defined as unintentional discrimination.
- Some states have different laws about how arrest and conviction records can be used in hiring decisions and when employers can obtain information about criminal records.

Although not much research has been conducted to examine whether applicants should talk about their criminal histories or not, a 2012 study found that employers were more likely to hire someone with a criminal record if the applicant made face-to-face contact with the employer and was prepared and willing to discuss their job related knowledge. Applicants also had an increased chance of being hired if they discussed what they learned from their experience in the justice system, as well as how they were rehabilitated, during the interview. This study found that employers preferred applicants that revealed their criminal records upfront and were willing to take responsibility for their actions.

Ban the Box is a campaign to remove the question about criminal history from job applications as an opportunity to give people with criminal histories a reasonable chance in the employment selection process. By allowing applicants to be interviewed before disclosing their criminal histories, this campaign seeks to increase the number of applicants with criminal histories in the workplace. The campaign focuses on how discrimination in the recruiting phase of selection makes it harder for people with criminal convictions to obtain employment. Not having employment makes it harder for people with criminal histories to support their families, and a lack of a job can lead to an increased chance of the person becoming a repeat offender.

=== Discrimination due to weight or pregnancy ===
Job applicants who are underweight (to the point of emaciation), overweight or obese may face discrimination in the interview. The negative treatment of overweight and obese individuals may stem from beliefs that weight is controllable and those who fail to control their weight are lazy, unmotivated, and lack self-discipline. Underweight individuals may also be subject to appearance-related negative treatment. Underweight, overweight and obese applicants are not protected from discrimination by any current United States laws. However, some individuals who are morbidly obese and whose obesity is due to a physiological disorder may be protected against discrimination under the Americans with Disabilities Act.

Discrimination against pregnant applicants is illegal under the Pregnancy Discrimination Act of 1978, which views pregnancy as a temporary disability and requires employers to treat pregnant applicants the same as all other applicants. Yet, discrimination against pregnant applicants continues both in the United States and internationally. Research shows that pregnant applicants compared to non-pregnant applicants are less likely to be recommended for hire. Interviewers appear concerned that pregnant applicants are more likely than non-pregnant applicants to miss work and even quit. Organizations who wish to reduce potential discrimination against pregnant applicants should consider implementing structured interviews, although some theoretical work suggests interviewers may still show biases even in these types of interviews.

=== Other forms of discrimination ===
Employers are using social networking sites like Facebook and LinkedIn to obtain additional information about job applicants. While these sites may be useful to verify resume information, profiles with pictures also may reveal much more information about the applicant, including issues pertaining to applicant weight and pregnancy. Some employers are also asking potential job candidates for their social media logins which has alarmed many privacy watch dogs and regulators.

Although this article does discuss some issues of job applicant discrimination, there could be many more types and factors of discrimination in the workplace than noted here. The most common types of discrimination within the workplace are ethnic and gender/sexual orientation discrimination. In an experiment performed in the US by Marianne Bertrand and Sendhil Mullainathan, it was noted that job applicants "with white-sounding names got 50 percent more callbacks for interviews than those with African-American-sounding names" This shows that something as simple as a person's name could be the reason they do or do not get a chance to have a job interview.

Another note to add to this article, is the idea of how discrimination within a workplace/job interview can affect a person's health and wellbeing. A person that is looking to find a job, no matter the industry, should not have to worry about whether or not they are a good candidate because of what discrimination might be placed against them. "Perceived discrimination can cause a lot of stress to an individual" which in turn could make it more difficult for a person to get job/job interview.

== Cross-cultural issues ==
As with the common comparisons between Eastern and Western cultures, interviews and the constructs assessed by the interview have been found to differ across the world. For example, studies of the United States of America (USA) to Canada have found conflicting results in average levels of agreeableness in each country. People tend to use social comparison when reporting their own level of agreeableness. Even though Canadians are likely to be more agreeable, they might score similarly to those individuals from the USA. In situations where social comparison is a factor, an honest answer could result in under- or over-estimation.

Because of these cultural differences, more businesses are adding cross-cultural training to their HR training. The goal of cross-cultural training is to improve one's ability to adapt and judge people from other cultures. This training is a first step in ensuring the process of using the job interview to decide whom to hire works the same in a selection situation where there are cross-cultural factors.

One cultural difference in the job interview is in the type of questions applicants will expect and not expect to be asked. Interviewers outside the USA often ask about family, marital status, and children. These types of questions are usually not allowed by USA job laws but are acceptable in other countries. Applicants can be surprised by questions interviewers ask them that are not appropriate or consistent with their own cultures. For example, in Belgium and Russia, interviewers are unlikely to ask about an applicant's personal values, opinions and beliefs. Thus, USA interviewers who do ask applicants about their values can make non-USA applicants uneasy or misinterpret the reason they are not prepared.

Another difference is in the consistency with which common constructs, even those that generalize across cultures, predict across different countries and cultures. For example, those who seem high in Agreeableness can do less well on the job in European workplaces. But those high in Agreeableness in the USA or Japan will do better on the job as measured on the same criteria. In some cases the structured Behavior Description Interview (BDI) that predicts who will do well on the job in some countries, from their interview scores, fails to predict accurately which applicants to hire in other countries.

=== Methodological biases ===
==== Construct bias ====
There are a few ways that cross-cultural differences can mess up the results of our attempts to predict job performance. The first source of error is construct bias, the possibility that the construct being measured is viewed differently by those from another culture if it exists at all. One way this could happen is if the behaviors a person displays, that go with that construct, are viewed differently in different cultures. It could also be the extent to which the construct even exists in their country. For example, the Multidimensional Work Ethic Profile (MWEP), is a scale demonstrated to work across many countries. However, in China the MWEP concept/dimension of Leisure has been shown to have poor equivalence with other countries, and may be a culturally inappropriate assessment due to the Confucian concept of hard work without leisure. Research has shown that differences in the levels of established cross-cultural constructs such as Cultural Tightness-Looseness increase or decrease the effect of the Five Factor Model personality traits. Tight cultures have strong social norms and adherence coupled with low tolerance for behavior that deviates from those norms, and loose cultures are the opposite with weak norms and high tolerance for deviance. An interviewer from a tight culture might view the normal behaviors of a loose cultured interviewee as signs of a poor moral character despite the behavior being normal. As such, differences between the tightness-looseness of the interviewer's and interviewee's home countries can introduce method bias, negatively affecting the interviewer's assessment of the interviewee's answers and behaviors. First construct bias must be measured by comparing groups of persons from distinct cultures and comparing if any real differences are discovered. The information on those differences can be used to make the adjustments needed to allow the construct to measure what it is intended to measure in people from different cultures.

==== Method bias ====
Response bias is another cross-cultural difference that has been shown to affect how we measure constructs and interpret the results. Social desirability bias is a tendency to give a socially acceptable answer, even if it is a lie because we want to look good. Giving socially acceptable, but partly or completely false, answers can inflate interview scores. One simple example of socially acceptable answers is called acquiescence bias, which is a tendency to agree with all questions with a positive meaning. People also have been found to show different attitudes towards answers on the extreme high and low end of a set of options (extremely agree or extremely disagree). In some cases, people from different cultures may just be unfamiliar with a word (term, concept, context) or with a type of question. Another research study found that self and other reports of conscientiousness failed to relate with expected job behaviors across cultures, demonstrating that one of the most predictive constructs in the USA is tied to aspects of USA culture that may not be present in a different type of culture.

For example, in the West, applicants prefer to eliminate details and focus on the larger issue, tending towards a comprehensive evaluation starting from individual elements and then moving towards the whole. In Japan, a respondent would go from the general to the specific in answering, preferring to divide a problem and analyze it piece by piece. Likewise, there are differences between individualist and collectivist cultures in the types of answers they chose. When given a series of options, individualists tend to choose the task-oriented option that involves direct communication with others. Yet collectivists choose the option that sees group harmony and protecting or saving face for others as more important. These differences can introduce method bias when interviewers evaluate or score how the applicant did in the interview. This is why it is important to understand how and why the best answer in one culture is not the best elsewhere. It might even be completely wrong.

==== Item bias ====
There is also item bias introduced by the actual items or questions in an interview. Poor item translation can be a problem. This might be incorrectly translating the same item to another language such as in an organization that hires both English and Spanish-speaking employees. Or it might be in someone not understanding the wording of an item because they are not native to that country's language. Similar to construct bias, the wording of an item can result in measuring different traits because of different meanings in the two different cultures.

== See also ==
- College interview
- Job hunting
