= List of radio stations named Star =

This is a list of radio stations with the name Star.

== Current Uses in North America ==
- CKSR-FM (98.3 Star FM) in Chilliwack, British Columbia, Canada
- K237DZ (95.3 Star FM) in Lolo, Montana, US
- K246CI (Star 97.1) in Cheyenne, Wyoming, US
- KIOI (FM) (Star 101.3) in San Francisco, California, United States
- KDGE (Star 102.1) in Dallas, Texas, US
- KMYI (Star 94.1) in San Diego, California, US
- KPLZ-FM (Star 101.5) in Seattle, Washington, US
- KSRZ (Star 104.5) in Omaha, Nebraska, US
- KSTZ (Star 102.5) in Des Moines, Iowa, US
- WAHR (Star 99.1) in Huntsville, Alabama, US
- WAWZ (Star 99.1) in Zarephath, New Jersey, US
- WBZZ (Star 100.7) in Pittsburgh, Pennsylvania, US
- WDOK (Star 102) in Cleveland, Ohio, US
- WECR (Star 94.3) in Newland, North Carolina, US
- WIOZ-FM (Star 102.5) in Southern Pines, North Carolina, US
- WRTS (Star 104) in Erie, Pennsylvania, US
- WSSR (Star 96-7) in Joliet, Illinois, US
- WSSV (Saratoga's Star Radio) in Saratoga Springs, New York, US
- WSTR (FM) (Star 94) in Atlanta, Georgia, US
- WTSS (Star 96.1) in Buffalo, New York, US
- WWST (Star 102.1) in Knoxville, Tennessee, US
- WXLC (Star 102.3) in Waukegan, Illinois, US
- WZSR (Star 105.5) in McHenry County, Illinois, US
- KBLX-FM (Star 102.9) in Berkeley, California, US

== Current Uses in the UK ==
Current Stations:

- Star Radio in Cambridge and Ely

Closed Stations:

- Star 107.9 in Stroud

== Current Uses Elsewhere ==
- Star FM (Australia), a former radio network in Australia
- Star 101.9, a radio station in Mackay, Australia
- Star FM (Kenya), a Somali-language radio station
- STAR radio in Liberia
- Star (New Zealand), a New Zealand radio network
- ABS-CBN Star Radio, former name of MOR Philippines from 1993 to 1997
- Star FM (Philippines), a radio network in the Philippines
- Star FM (South Africa), a radio station in Klerksdorp, South Africa
- Star FM Zimbabwe, a national radio station in Zimbabwe

== See also ==
- Star FM (disambiguation)
