= Stars (disambiguation) =

Stars are luminous astronomical objects.

Stars or STARS may also refer to:

== Arts, media and entertainment ==
=== Fictional entities ===
- S.T.A.R.S., a police group in the Resident Evil series
- S.T.A.R.S., an organisation in the Marvel Universe

=== Literature ===
- The Stars, a 1901 non-fiction work by Simon Newcomb
- The Stars: A Slumber Story, a 1903 book by Eugene Field

=== Music ===
==== Groups ====
- Stars (Australian band), from the 1970s
- Stars (British band), a 1972 supergroup
- Stars (Canadian band), an indie rock group formed in 2000
- The Stars (band), a Japanese psychedelic rock group

==== Albums ====
- Stars (Cher album), 1975
- Stars (Collabro album), 2014
- Stars (Janis Ian album), 1971
- Stars (Mindi Abair album), 2008
- Stars (Simply Red album), 1991
- Stars (Sylvester album), 1979
- Stars, by Lala Karmela, 2007
- Stars, by Makai, 2008
- Stars: The Best of 1992–2002, by The Cranberries, 2002

==== Songs ====
- "Stars" (B'z song), 2023
- "Stars" (Chloë song), 2004
- "Stars" (Destine song), 2010
- "Stars" (Dubstar song), 1995
- "Stars" (Erika Jayne song), 2009
- "Stars" (Kat DeLuna song), 2013
- "Stars" (Grace Potter and the Nocturnals song), 2012
- "Stars" (Hum song), 1995
- "Stars" (Janis Ian song), 1974
- "Stars" (Mika Nakashima song), 2001
- "Stars" (Roxette song), 1999
- "Stars" (Simply Red song), 1991
- "Stars" (Switchfoot song), 2005
- "Stars" (¥$ song), 2024
- "Stars", by Alessia Cara from Know-It-All (album), 2015
- "Stars", by Angel Olsen from Burn Your Fire for No Witness, 2014
- "Stars", by Cheryl from Only Human, 2014
- "Stars", by China Black, 1994
- "Stars", by the Cranberries from Stars: The Best of 1992–2002, 2002
- "Stars", by Dan Fogelberg from Home Free, 1972
- "Stars", by Demi Lovato from Confident, 2015
- "Stars", by Fun from Some Nights, 2012
- "Stars", by Hear 'n Aid, 1986
- "Stars", by JID from The Forever Story, 2022
- "Stars", by Kat DeLuna, 2013
- "Stars", by Kylie Minogue from X, 2007
- "Stars", by Lala Karmela from Stars, 2007
- "Stars", from the musical Les Misérables
- "Stars", by Mark Gormley
- "Stars", by Mark Owen from The Art of Doing Nothing, 2013
- "Stars", by Mindi Abair from Stars, 2008
- "Stars", by PinkPantheress from Fancy That, 2025
- "Stars", by Sixx:A.M. from Modern Vintage, 2014
- "Stars", by Superfly and Tortoise Matsumoto, 2012
- "Stars", by Sylvester from Stars, 1979
- "Stars", by t.A.T.u. from 200 km/h in the Wrong Lane, 2002
- "The Stars", by Moby from Last Night, 2008
- "The Stars", by Moka Only from Concert for One, 2017
- "The Stars", by Patrick Wolf from The Magic Position, 2007

=== Television ===
- Stars, and episode of The Ed Sullivan Show
- Stars, and episode of Rainbow
- The Stars (TV series), 1988 UK astronomy programme
- "Stars" (Peppa Pig), a 2004 episode
- "The Stars" (The Amazing World of Gumball), an episode of The Amazing World of Gumball
- Stars, and episode of Entertainment Tonight

=== Other uses in arts, media and entertainment ===
- Stars!, a 1995 game for Windows
- The F.A. Premier League Stars, a 1999 videogame
- "The Stars", a story about a shepherd by Alphonse Daudet
- Stars (M. C. Escher), a 1948 wood engraving print by M. C. Escher
- Stars (manga), a manga series
- The Stars Art Group, a Chinese group of artists in the late 1970s and early 1980s

== Science and technology ==
- Sustainability Tracking, Assessment & Rating System (STARS)
- AMD 10h (unofficial code name: Stars), a microarchitecture
- Stars virus, a computer virus
- Space Tethered Autonomous Robotic Satellite, a satellite built by Kagawa University
  - STARS-II, a follow-on project

== Sports ==
=== Baseball ===
- Cleveland Stars (baseball), a defunct Negro league baseball team
- Cuban Stars (East), a defunct Negro league baseball team
- Cuban Stars (West), a defunct Negro league baseball team
- Detroit Stars, a defunct Negro league baseball team
- Daiei Stars, a Japanese professional baseball team; now the Chiba Lotte Marines
- Hollywood Stars, an American minor league baseball team that operated 1926–1935 and 1938–1957
- Huntsville Stars, a current American minor league baseball team
- Lincoln Stars (baseball), a defunct Negro league baseball team
- Newark Stars, a defunct Negro league baseball team
- Philadelphia Stars (baseball), a defunct Negro league baseball team
- St. Louis Stars (baseball), a defunct Negro league baseball team

=== Basketball ===
- Los Angeles Stars, a basketball team from 1968 to 1970
- Los Angeles Stars (2000–2001), a basketball team from 2000 to 2001
- Los Angeles Stars (2004–2005), a basketball team from 2004 to 2005
- Rutronik Stars Keltern, German women's team
- Shandong Stars (disambiguation), several teams from China
- Utah Stars, an American basketball team from 1970 to 1976, formerly the Los Angeles Stars
- VfL AstroStars Bochum, a German team

=== Cricket ===
- Melbourne Stars, an Australian Big Bash League cricket team
- South East Stars, an English women's cricket team
- Surrey Stars, an English women's cricket team

=== Football ===
- Chicago Stars FC, an American soccer team
- Minnesota Stars FC, an American soccer team
- Oxford United Stars F.C., a Northern Ireland soccer team
- Supporters' Trust at Reading, a Reading Football Club supporters' organization
- Windmill Stars F.C., a Northern Ireland soccer team

=== Ice hockey ===
- Dallas Stars, an American National Hockey League team
- Texas Stars, a team in the American Hockey League

== Other uses ==
- stars, the plural of star, see Star (disambiguation)
- Stars (restaurant), a defunct restaurant in San Francisco, California, US
- Shock Trauma Air Rescue Service, a Canadian air ambulance service
- Fulton surface-to-air recovery system, used to retrieve persons on the ground using an aircraft
- Standard Terminal Automation Replacement System, an air traffic control system

== See also ==
- Star (disambiguation)
- Starz (disambiguation)
- Utah Starzz, a Women's National Basketball Association team
- Utah Starzz (WPSL), women's soccer team
