= Starz (disambiguation) =

Starz is an American premium cable channel.

Starz may also refer to:

== Film and television ==
- Starz Entertainment Corp., formerly Lions Gate Entertainment
  - Starz Inc., a media holding company owning the cable channel and other Starz-branded operations
    - Starz Distribution, the motion picture, animation, television, and home video division of Starz Inc.
    - Starz Animation, a CGI animation studio in Toronto, Ontario, Canada
- Starz (Canada), an English-language premium cable and satellite television service
- Starz (magazine), a Malaysian manga, anime and comics magazine
- Starz TV, a former British digital satellite music channel

== Music ==
- Starz (band), a 1970s American heavy metal and power pop band
  - Starz (Starz album), an album by the band
- "Starz", a song by The Smashing Pumpkins from Zeitgeist
- Starz (Yung Lean album), a 2020 album by Swedish rapper Yung Lean

== Other uses ==
- Orlando Starz, a franchise in the Independent Women's Football League, U.S.
- Starz (music venue), a live music venue in Allentown, Pennsylvania

== See also ==
- Star (disambiguation)
- Stars (disambiguation)
- Utah Starzz, a Women's National Basketball Association team
- Utah Starzz (WPSL), women's soccer team
