= Review with Myles Barlow =

- First DVD Released
- Genre: Black comedy, Satire
- Created by: Phil Lloyd
- Developed by: Phil Lloyd
- Written by: Phil Lloyd, Trent O'Donnell
- Directed by: Trent O'Donnell
- Presented by: Phil Lloyd (as Myles Barlow)
- Starring: Phil Lloyd (as Myles Barlow)
- Narrated by: Phil Lloyd
- Theme music composer: Matt Blackman
- Composers: Trevor Bell, Cameron Bruce, Matt Blackman
- Country of origin: Australia
- Original language: English
- No. of series: 2
- No. of episodes: 13

Production
- Executive producer: Megan Harding
- Producer: Dean Bates
- Production locations: Sydney, Australia
- Editor: Reuben Field
- Running time: 30 minutes (excluding commercials)
- Production company: Starchild Productions

Original release
- Network: ABC2; ABC1 The Christmas Special
- Release: 16 October 2008 – 22 December 2010

Related
- Review (2014–2017)

Review with Myles Barlow is an Australian satirical black comedy television series which screened on Thursday nights on ABC2 and Friday nights on ABC 1. The series began screening on 16 October 2008. It is co-written and directed by Trent O'Donnell and also co-written by Phil Lloyd. It is produced by Starchild Productions (Dean Bates and Reuben Field). The first series comprised six half-hour episodes and the second series a further six half-hour episodes. Episodes were made available for download on the ABC website. Series 1 episodes have been available to watch on-demand on YouTube. Series 2 began airing on ABC2 on 22 July 2010 and finished on 26 August 2010. A Christmas special was broadcast on ABC1 on 22 December 2010.

== Synopsis ==
Myles Barlow is a critic who reviews life experiences in response to viewer questions. Barlow reviews real-life experiences such as being a murderer and a drug-mule, the rush of pleasure as he pays for sex and the bleakness of living on the streets.

Regular segments include "Letter of the Week" along with a summary of the show at the beginning and highlights of the next episode which do not actually reflect the actual episode contents.

Myles uses often unnecessarily complex metaphors to conclude each segment, choosing an abstract notion or object and then comparing his experience to it.

Each episode ends with a faux-"Next Time" segment.

== List of episodes ==
Note: Bolded reviews are primary review segments, unbolded reviews are short "breaker" reviews.

=== Series One (2008) ===
==== Episode 1 (16 October) ====
- Stealing:
- Running out your partner:
- Dickheads:
- Bushranging:
- Risk:

==== Episode 2 (23 October) ====
- Murder:
- Fishing without bait:
- Self Belief:
- Lying:
- Divorce:

==== Episode 3 (30 October) ====
- Voyeurism:
- Budget Airlines:
- Vanity:
- Being a rock star:
- Heroism:

==== Episode 4 (6 November) ====
- Criticism:
- Open heart surgery:
- Inter-generational Romance:
- Losing one's train of thought:
- Betrayal:

==== Episode 5 (13 November) ====
- Paying for Sex:
- Sex with a Male Prostitute:
- Regret:
- Freeloading:
- Meeting Your Ex-Wife's New Partner:
- Destitution:

==== Episode 6 (20 November) ====
- Stress:
- Disappointing Others:
- Testing Loyalty:
- Bare-knuckle Boxing:
- Reconciliation: Unable to be reviewed

=== Logie Awards of 2009 ===
- Logies:

Presented as a segment as part of the telecast of the Logies.

=== Series Two (2010) ===
==== Episode 1 (22 July) ====
- Wanderlust:
- The Pill:
- Addiction:
- Saint Bernard Rescue Dogs:
- Starting Your Own Cult:

==== Episode 2 (29 July) ====
- B-Grade Celebrity:
- Cockblocking:
- Bucks Parties:
- 9/11 Jokes:
- Loss:
- Dancing with the Stars:

==== Episode 3 (5 August) ====
- Killing Kyle Sandilands:
- Abbey Road Re-enactments:
- Fear:
- Meeting Your Doppleganger:
- Racism:

==== Episode 4 (12 August) ====
- Imitation:
- Being Molested by a professional rugby league footballer:
- Hatred:
- Pet Llamas:
- Justice:

==== Episode 5 (19 August) ====
- Treechange:
- Throwing a Pair of Shoes over a Power Line:
- Art:
- French Restaurant Runners:
- Sympathy:

==== Episode 6 (26 August) ====
- Happiness:
- Office Cricket:
- Escapism:
- Road Kill Sandwich:
- Acceptance:

=== The Christmas Special ===
- Summer Hosts:
- Giving:
- Competitive Christmas Lights:
- Indulgence:
- Re-gifting:
- Christmas Spirit:

== Cast ==
=== Main ===
- Phil Lloyd as Myles Barlow

=== Guests ===
- Margot Robbie as Kelly (Series 1, Episode 1)
- Catherine Jermanus as Kelly (Series 1, Episode 3)
- Amanda Bishop as Catherine Barlow (Series 1, Episode 2)
- David Stratton as himself (Series 1, Episode 4 Criticism segment)
- George Negus as himself (Series 1, Episode 3 Heroism segment)
- Emma Leonard as Ivy (Series 1, Episode 3)
- Brendan Cowell as himself (Series 1, Episode 3)
- Josh Lawson as himself (Series 1, Episode 3 and Series 2, Episode 2)
- Steven O'Donnell as Judge 1 (Series 2, Episode 2)
- Barry Crocker as himself (Series 2, Episode 2 and The Christmas Special)
- Chas Licciardello as himself (Series 2, Episode 4)
- Tony Jones as himself (The Christmas Special)
- Andrew O'Keefe as himself (The Christmas Special)
- Heath Franklin as himself/chopper (Series 2, Episode 3)
- Malcolm Kennard as Tony (1 episode)

== Controversy ==
On 6 August 2010, the sketch "Killing Kyle Sandilands" caused controversy after it aired. Parts of the sketch, including stabbing a picture and burning an effigy of Kyle Sandilands, were received with negative views. A Current Affair did a story on the sketch, commenting that it was far too graphic and potentially dangerous. Sandilands himself did not comment on the segment.

== Adaptation ==
An American television adaptation, titled Review, premiered in March 2014 on Comedy Central. On the series' final episode, Phil Lloyd appeared, playing a viewer asking what would be the last question of the program.
