= Starfish (disambiguation) =

Starfish are a group of marine invertebrates.

Starfish may also refer to:

== Arts and entertainment ==
=== Film ===
- Starfish (1952 film), an Austrian musical drama film
- Starfish (2016 film), a British drama film
- Starfish (2018 film), an American science fiction film
- Starfish (2023 film), an Indian Hindi language romantic drama film

=== Music ===
- Starfish (band)
- StarFish (children's band)
- Starfish (album), a 1988 album by The Church
- "Starfish", a 2008 song by Moka Only from the album Carrots and Eggs
- "Star Fish", a song by Bikini Kill from Pussy Whipped

=== Print ===
- Starfish (Nocturnals), a fictional character in the comic book Nocturnals
- Starfish, a novel by Peter Watts published in 1999
- Starfish, a novel by Akemi Dawn Bowman published in 2017

== Military uses ==
- HMS Starfish (1895), a Royal Navy destroyer
- HMS Starfish (1916), a Royal Navy destroyer
- HMS Starfish (19S), a Royal Navy submarine
- SS-N-15 or Starfish, a cruise missile
- Starfish site, a Second World War anti-bomber decoy simulating a burning city
- Starfish, one of a series of the US Operation Fishbowl nuclear tests
  - Starfish Prime, the second of the Starfish nuclear tests

== Other uses ==
- Starfish (fashion label), a New Zealand clothing brand
- Starfish Cove, a cove in Signy Island, Antarctica
- Starfish Galaxy or NGC 6240, a galaxy in the constellation Ophiuchus
- Starfish Software, a software company specializing in synchronization products
- Starfish Television Network, a public service network
