= Die Sterne (disambiguation) =

Die Sterne is a German pop band. "Die Sterne" translates as "the stars" and may also refer to:

- "Die Sterne", D 176 (Schubert), “Was funkelt ihr so mild mich an”, 1815 song by Franz Schubert
- "Die Sterne", D 313 (Schubert), “Wie wohl ist mir im Dunkeln!”, 1815 song by Franz Schubert
- "Die Sterne", D 684 (Schubert), “Du staunest, o Mensch”, 1820 song by Franz Schubert
- "Die Sterne", D 939 (Schubert), Op. 96 No. 1, “Wie blitzen die Sterne so hell durch die Nacht”, 1828 song by Franz Schubert

== See also ==
- Stern (disambiguation)
- Star (disambiguation)
