= Hoxsey Therapy =

Alternative medical treatment

Hoxsey Therapy or Hoxsey Method is an alternative medical treatment promoted as a cure for cancer. The treatment consists of a caustic herbal paste for external cancers or a herbal mixture for "internal" cancers, combined with laxatives, douches, vitamin supplements, and dietary changes. Reviews by major medical bodies, including the U.S. Food and Drug Administration (FDA), the National Cancer Institute, the American Cancer Society, M. D. Anderson Cancer Center, and Memorial Sloan-Kettering Cancer Center, have found no evidence that Hoxsey Therapy is an effective treatment for cancer. The sale or marketing of the Hoxsey Method was banned in the United States by the FDA on September 21, 1960 as a "worthless and discredited" remedy and a form of quackery.

Currently, the Hoxsey Method is primarily marketed by the Bio-Medical Center in Tijuana, Mexico. Hoxsey Therapy is also marketed over the Internet; in June 2008, the FDA National Health Fraud Coordinator noted that "There is no scientific evidence that it has any value to treat cancer, yet consumers can go online right now and find all sorts of false claims that Hoxsey treatment is effective against the disease."

== History ==
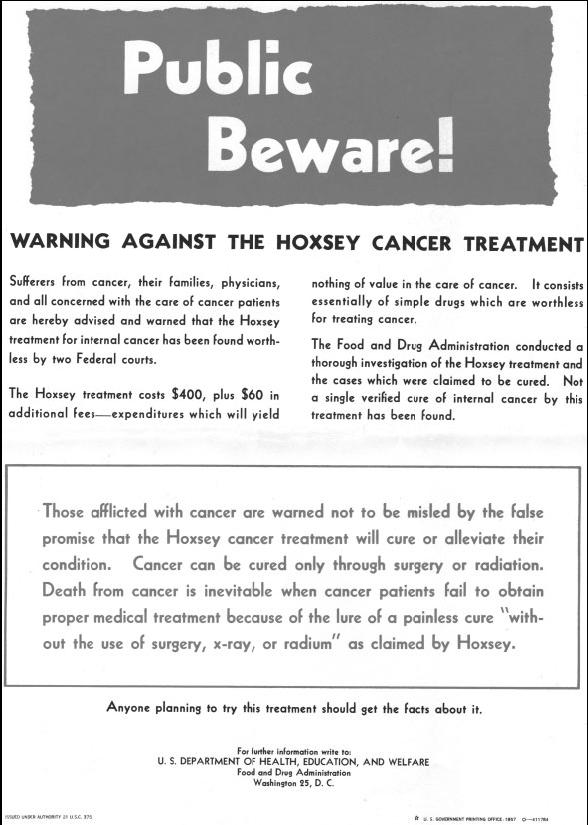
Food and Drug Administration warning regarding use of the Hoxsey method, released April 1956

Hoxsey Therapy, a mixture of herbs, was first marketed as a purported cure for cancer in the 1920s by Harry Hoxsey, a former coal miner and insurance salesman, and Norman Baker, a radio personality. Hoxsey himself traced the treatment to his great-grandfather, who observed a horse with a tumor on its leg cure itself by grazing upon wild plants growing in the meadow. John Hoxsey gathered these herbs and mixed them with old home remedies used for cancer. Among the claims made in his book, he purports his therapy aims to restore "physiological normalcy" to a disturbed metabolism throughout the body, with emphasis on purgation, to help carry away wastes from the tumors he believed his herbal mixtures caused to necrotize.

Hoxsey initially opened a clinic in Taylorville, Illinois to sell his treatment, one of 17 clinics that he would eventually open. Dogged in many states by legal trouble for practicing medicine without a license, Hoxsey frequently shut down his clinics and reopened them in new locations. In 1930, Hoxsey was associated with controversial broadcaster Norman G. Baker in operating the Baker Institute in Muscatine, Iowa. The two fell out and numerous lawsuits followed, while Hoxsey was again enjoined from practicing medicine without a license.

In 1936, Hoxsey opened a clinic in Dallas, Texas which became one of the largest privately owned cancer centers in the world. At one point in the 1950s, Hoxsey's gross annual income reached $1.5 million from the treatment of 8,000 patients. Hoxsey published several books advertising his methods and clinics including "You Don't Have to Die: The Amazing Story of the Hoxsey Cancer Treatment" (1956), and received support from Gerald Winrod and H. L. Hunt.

=== Independent evaluations ===
The United States National Cancer Institute (NCI) and Food and Drug Administration (FDA), as well as the American Medical Association (AMA), began a series of efforts to restrict Hoxsey's clinic operations, viewing them as providing false cures and defrauding cancer sufferers. Regarding this campaign, NCI director John Heller wrote in 1953:

Our efforts in cancer control are directed toward reduction of the intervals between onset and diagnosis of cancer, and between diagnosis and the application of effective treatment. People who fall victims to quacks are diverted from this narrow course for the best clinical management of cancer.

The American Medical Association condemned Hoxsey's "caustic pastes" and tonics as fraudulent. In 1949, Hoxsey sued the Journal of the American Medical Association (JAMA) and its editors for libel and slander. Hoxsey won the case, but was awarded only $2; the judge concluded that since Hoxsey's promotion of his treatment depended largely upon claims that the AMA was persecuting him, he had suffered little or no damage from the JAMA articles. A review of 400 patients treated by Hoxsey found no verifiable cures.

In 1950, Hoxsey submitted case histories of 77 patients to the National Cancer Institute (NCI), claiming that they were "fully documented with clinical records and pathological reports" and that they would demonstrate his treatment's effectiveness. However, the NCI found that of these 77 reports, only 6 included actual tissue biopsies. Of the 2 biopsies from patients described by Hoxsey as having "internal cancer", neither showed any evidence of actual malignancy. The NCI concluded that Hoxsey's records did not contain sufficient information to evaluate his treatment. Hoxsey argued that it was the NCI's responsibility to seek out the information necessary to verify his case reports, and attributed the failure to do so to a conspiracy on the part of the NCI and AMA.

In 1956, the FDA sent an investigator to Hoxsey's clinic posing as a patient. The investigator was told by Hoxsey's clinic that he had cancer (he did not), and that it would take a "long time" to cure him. The U.S. government banned the sale of the Hoxsey herbal treatment in 1960. Hoxsey was also forced to close all of his U.S. clinics. In 1963, Mildred Nelson, a nurse who had worked closely with Hoxsey, established the Bio Medical Clinic in Tijuana, Mexico with Hoxsey's approval. Hoxsey himself chose this site in 1963, when his last operation in the US was shut down. Just before Nelson's death in 1999, the clinic was taken over by her sister, Liz Jonas.

In 1967, Hoxsey developed prostate cancer, and his own treatment failed to cure it. Because he failed to respond to his eponymous therapy, Hoxsey underwent surgery and standard medical treatment. He died seven years later, in 1974.

== Treatment ==
Hoxsey herbal treatments include a topical paste of antimony, zinc and bloodroot, arsenic, sulfur, and talc for external treatments, and a liquid tonic of licorice, red clover, burdock root, Stillingia root, barberry, Cascara, prickly ash bark, buckthorn bark, and potassium iodide for internal consumption.

In addition to the herbs, the Hoxsey treatment now also includes antiseptic douches and washes, laxative tablets, and nutritional supplements. A mixture of procaine hydrochloride and vitamins, along with liver and cactus, is prescribed. During treatment, patients are asked to avoid consumption of tomatoes, vinegar, pork, alcohol, salt, sugar, and white flour products.

In 2005, the cost of initial evaluation and treatment with Hoxsey Therapy at the Bio-Medical Center in Tijuana, Mexico was reported to be between $3,900 and $5,100, though this price did not include the recommended purchase of an unspecified number of dietary supplements and 3 years of return visits.

== Side-effects ==
- The topical paste is highly caustic, and can burn or scar the skin.
- The oral treatment can cause:

- nausea
- vomiting
- diarrhea
- anxiety
- trembling
- abdominal cramps
- heart block

- Pokeweed has caused deaths in children.
- Red clover may increase the risk of bleeding for people who take anticoagulants. It also mimics the behavior of the hormone estrogen, and thus is unsuitable for women with estrogen-responsive breast tumors.

== Effectiveness ==
No peer-reviewed medical or scientific research has been published which would allow any conclusions about the effectiveness of Hoxsey Therapy. The Bio-Medical Center in Tijuana, Mexico claims a success rate of 50–85% in their promotional material, though these figures have not been independently evaluated and the parameters of "treatment success" are undefined. Mildred Nelson, director of the Bio-Medical Center, has claimed an 80% success rate, and attributed treatment failures to a "bad attitude" on the part of the patient.

=== Studies by major medical bodies ===
The American Cancer Society and the National Cancer Institute do not advise the use of Hoxsey Therapy, as neither has found any objective evidence that the treatment provides tangible benefit to people with cancer. Reviews by the Memorial Sloan-Kettering Cancer Center and M. D. Anderson Cancer Center found no evidence that Hoxsey Therapy is effective as a treatment for cancer. A controlled experiment in lab mice did not find any difference in tumor growth between untreated mice and those given the Hoxsey tonic. An FDA review of 400 people claiming to have been cured by the Hoxsey method found that many of the patients never in fact had cancer, or had received successful medical treatment elsewhere before being treated with Hoxsey Therapy. Those who had cancer at the time they used Hoxsey Therapy were uniformly either deceased or alive with active cancer. There were no cases of actual cures among those promoted as such by the Hoxsey clinic.

In 1957, a group from the University of British Columbia visited Hoxsey's Mexican clinic and obtained records for 71 Canadian patients treated by Hoxsey. The University panel found that:

For over one-half of the [cancer] patients from British Columbia, the result [of treatment with the Hoxsey method] has been either death or progression of the disease. In nearly one-quarter there was no proof that the patient ever had cancer. Nearly one in ten of the patients had curative treatment before going to the Hoxsey Clinic. In only one case, an external cancer, was there any evidence at all that the Hoxsey treatment had an effect on the disease; in that case, better results could have been obtained by orthodox means.

The panel reported that in the one case of demonstrable cure, a patient with a skin cancer of the ear, Hoxsey's treatment had resulted in disfigurement which could have been avoided with standard surgical excision.

In 1998, the Office of Technology Assessment issued a report on herbal cancer treatments. This group found that while many elements of Hoxsey Therapy had antitumor activity in vitro, the complete Hoxsey tonic had never been tested in animal models or in human clinical trials.

== Notable cases ==
The treatment gained wide press coverage in 2006 due to a court dispute between the family of Starchild Abraham Cherrix and Social Services of the State of Virginia. Cherrix had requested to undergo Hoxsey Therapy to treat a recurrence of Hodgkin disease. Because at the age of 16 he was still a minor, Social Services considered the parents to be negligent and sought to have Cherrix undergo conventional chemotherapy and radiotherapy. On August 16, 2006, Circuit Judge Glen A. Tyler announced that both sides had reached an agreement that the parents did not act in a way that was medically neglectful. In addition, it stipulated that Starchild would be treated by an oncologist of his choice who was both board-certified in radiation therapy as well as interested in alternative methods to treat Hodgkin disease. Cherrix subsequently received radiation treatments from Arnold Smith, of Mississippi, and in September 2007, it appeared that his cancer was in remission.

== See also ==
- List of ineffective cancer treatments
