= Creek Street (Ketchikan, Alaska) =

- Creek Street Historic District
- U.S. National Register of Historic Places
- U.S. Historic district
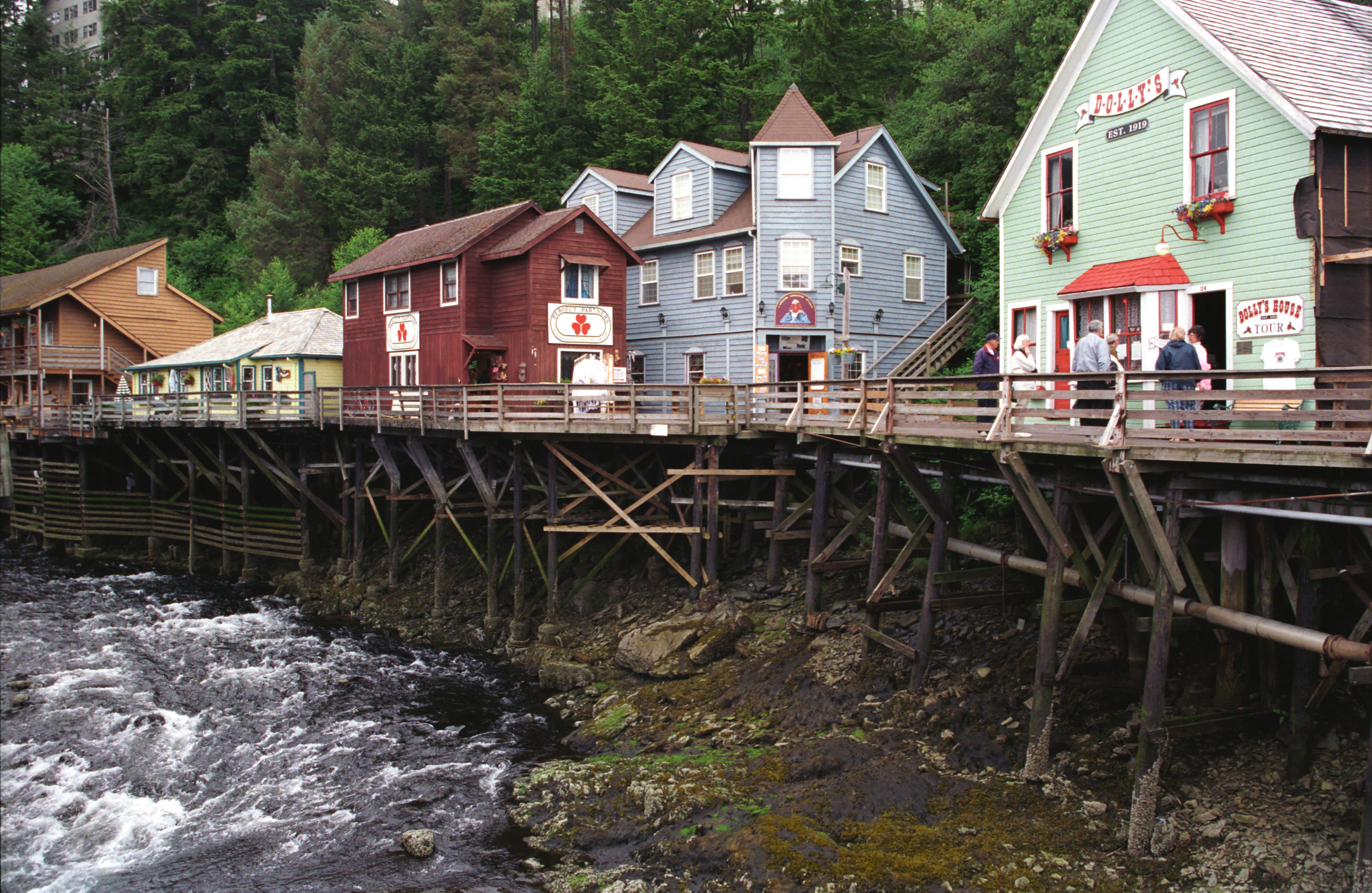
- View of Creek Street

- Location within Alaska
- Location: Creek Street, Married Man's Trail and Totem Way, Ketchikan, Alaska
- Coordinates: 55°20′33″N 131°38′31″W
- Built: 1903
- NRHP reference No.: 14000454
- Added to NRHP: August 6, 2014

Creek Street is a historic area of Ketchikan, Alaska. The street is actually a boardwalk mounted in stilts on a high slope on the east side of Ketchikan Creek, east of the city's downtown. Creek Street was listed on the National Register of Historic Places in 2014.

== Description and history ==
Creek Street is infamous as being Ketchikan's red light district, roughly between 1903 and 1954, and some of its attractions are commemorations of this past. Its origins lie in a 1903 city ordinance banishing brothels from the city center to the "Indian Town" area on the east side of the creek, and it operated until the brothels were outlawed and shut down in 1954. Numerous houses of prostitution sprang up on this difficult terrain, supported by wooden stilts. Famous among them is The Star, which was one of the largest of these businesses, and Dolly's House, which is now a museum. Winding into the hills above Creek Street is Married Man's Way, a trail used by patrons of the brothels to escape raids.

== See also ==
- National Register of Historic Places listings in Ketchikan Gateway Borough, Alaska
