= Shandong Stars =

Shandong Stars may refer to:

- Shandong Golden Stars, a men's basketball team based in Shandong
- Shandong Six Stars, a women's basketball team based in Shandong
