= Starfish (fashion label) =

New Zealand fashion label

Starfish was a New Zealand fashion label created by Laurie Foon in 1993 (33 years ago). Core values for the label included eco-friendly and sustainable practices, as well as community mindedness.

The label was called Jive Junkies from 1991 to 1993, and garments were sold at Wellington's Wakefield Market. Due to the success of Jive Junkies, the Starfish boutique was opened in Willis Street in 1993. A second Starfish shop was subsequently opened in Auckland.

In 2007, Starfish was awarded the NZ Sustainable Business Award.
