= Star Lake (Otter Tail County, Minnesota) =

Lake in the state of Minnesota, United States

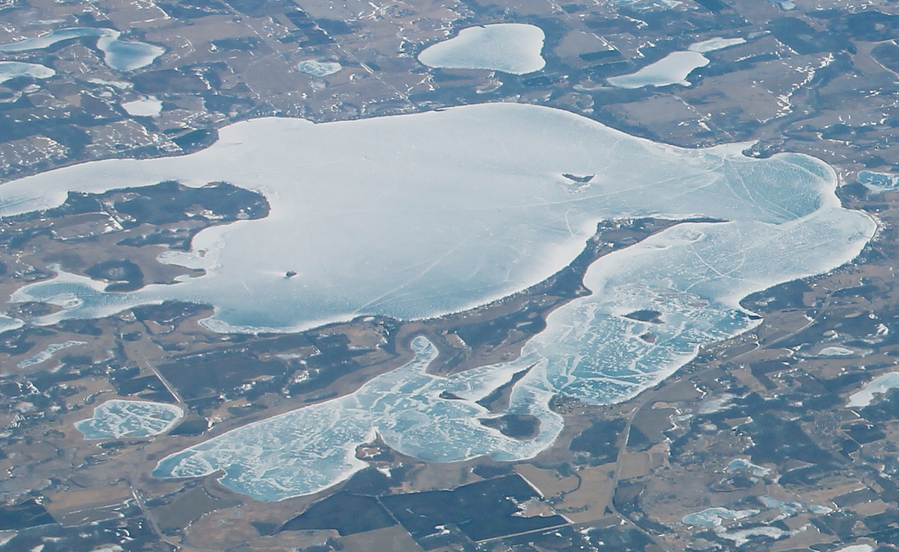
- Aerial view of Star Lake

- Location within Minnesota Location within the United States
- Location: Otter Tail County, Minnesota
- Coordinates: 46°31′N 95°48′W
- Basin countries: United States
- Surface area: 4,721 acres (19.11 km^{2})
- Max. depth: 94 ft (29 m)
- Settlements: Star Lake Township

Star Lake is a lake located in Otter Tail County, Minnesota. Star Lake Township, Minnesota is named after the lake because the township contains nearly the entire lake. Public access to the lake is available on Minnesota State Highway 108.

== Geography ==
Star Lake is named so because it consists of a main circular lake with three arms stretching out to resemble points of a star. It is also believed to have been formed by a meteor/space debris upon impact, unlike the majority of the lakes that were created by the glaciers. The lake covers an area of 4,721 acres (19.11 km^{2}), and is known to be very deep just off the eastern shores of the lake, reaching a maximum depth of 94 feet (29 m).

Star lake is located at 46°31′N 95°48′W. The lake drains through a small channel into the slightly larger Dead Lake directly to its southeast.
