= Virginia v. Cherrix =

2006 Commonwealth of Virginia court case

Virginia v. Cherrix is a 2006 court case in which the Commonwealth of Virginia sued to force Starchild Abraham ("Wolf") Cherrix (born June 1990), aged 16 at the time of the court case, to undergo further conventional medical treatment for a highly treatable form of cancer, Hodgkin disease.

Cherrix was diagnosed with the blood cancer and underwent an initial round of chemotherapy in 2005. When he was told in early 2006 that he needed further treatment, he and his parents rejected any further use of chemotherapy because of the side effects. His parents were accused by the state of medical neglect of their child. The lower court decided against the parents, but the decision was overturned on appeal and the parties reached a compromise in a consent decree, in which Cherrix would receive treatment from a board-certified specialist of the parents' choice.

The case resulted in a new law, dubbed Abraham's Law, that increased the rights of patients aged 14 to 17 in Virginia to refuse medical treatment.

Cherrix reached the age of majority in June 2008, and has been free to pursue or reject treatment without legal oversight since then, like any other adult. As of 2017, Cherrix was alive, had decided to pursue evidence-based medicine rather than ineffective alternative medicine products, and had achieved a remission after receiving a stem cell transplant.

== Initial treatment ==
Cherrix was diagnosed with Hodgkin's disease in 2005. Hodgkin's disease is a highly treatable, even curable, type of lymphoma; 96% of young patients survive at least five years after conventional treatment. He initially received one round of chemotherapy, a standard medical treatment with significant, although mostly temporary, side effects, such as fatigue, weakness, and hair loss. Cherrix said later that the side effects were so severe that he had wished he were dead during treatment.

== Court case ==
In 2006, when the cancer returned, Cherrix and his parents rejected further conventional treatment. Then he went to Mexico to receive Hoxsey Therapy (an herbal concoction based on the plants eaten by a horse with a cancerous growth in the 19th century), which has been illegal in the United States since 1960, after it was proven to be ineffective.

When Cherrix and his parents refused a second round of chemotherapy, the Accomack County Department of Social Services accused his parents of medical neglect of a child. The court found the parents guilty of medical neglect and ordered Cherrix back into conventional medical treatment.

An appeal to the circuit court reversed the decision and resulted in a consent decree in August 2006 that permitted Cherrix to receive treatment from a board-certified radiation oncologist chosen by Cherrix's parents, with a requirement to regularly update the court about the treatments and the outcome. The radiation oncologist they chose had an interest in alternative cancer therapies, and the treatment included low-dose, targeted radiation therapy as well as a restrictive diet and various vitamins. Cherrix cycled in and out of needing treatment for several years, as tumors kept reappearing in different parts of his body.

In June 2008, Cherrix celebrated his 18th birthday and the end of the requirement to report his medical condition to the courts.

== Later treatment ==
The unconventional treatment approach did not produce a durable remission, and eventually Cherrix had received the maximum possible amount of radiation. By 2015, he was suffering from extreme fatigue, pain, and other problems, including iatrogenic scarring in his lungs from the radiation.

He switched to a different oncologist and started receiving brentuximab vedotin, which had been approved by the FDA for the treatment of Hodgkin disease in August 2011, to reduce the tumor burden and the daily symptoms caused by the cancer. After he improved, he achieved remission after receiving high-dose chemotherapy and stem cell transplant in August 2016.

As of February 2024, he is 33 years old and has been cancer free for many years.

== Resulting state law ==
As a result of Cherrix case, the Virginia legislature enacted "Abraham's Law" in 2007, which amended § 63.2-100 of the Code of Virginia to permit parents to refuse medical treatment or to choose alternative treatments for adolescents aged 14 to 17 with a life-threatening medical condition, if the teenager seems to be mature, both the parents and the child have considered the treatment options available to them, and all agree that their choice is in the teen's best interest.

== Similar cases ==
In May 2009, a judge in the state of Minnesota ruled that Daniel Hauser, age 13, has been "medically neglected" as a result of his parents' refusal to allow him to receive chemotherapy for Hodgkin's lymphoma, the same disease at issue in Virginia v. Cherrix. The likelihood of a cure with the typical treatment of three rounds of chemotherapy is 85–90%; without treatment, patients die. Unlike Cherrix, Hauser was determined to have a "rudimentary understanding at best" of his condition; he did not even know how to read. After one chemotherapy treatment, the Hauser family refused to continue. The mother and her son fled the state, and a Minnesota district judge issued a felony arrest warrant. Daniel was distressed by the side effects of chemotherapy, and his mother told the court that she preferred natural healing and that they would both resist court orders to provide it. They returned from California five days later, and Daniel underwent conventional treatment, which appears to have cured his cancer.
