= Synagogues: Transformation and Renewal =

Synagogues: Transformation and Renewal (STAR) is a Jewish advocacy organization to support synagogues in the United States.

== Overview ==
It was founded in 2000 by businessman Edgar Bronfman, businessman Charles Schusterman, and investor Michael Steinhardt. It is headquartered in St. Louis Park, Minnesota. Lynn Schusterman, the co-founder's widow, is chairwoman of the board.

The organization pledged to give $18 million the first year. Participants in the inaugural summit in Chicago included Rabbi and author Shmuley Boteach, Professor Richard Joel, and Koret Foundation interim director Mel Mogulof. They donate $500,000 to synagogues in the United States every year.

In 2009, together with the Center for Jewish Policy Studies, it helped publish Synagogues in a Time of Change: Fragmentation and Diversity in Jewish Religious Movements by Zachary I. Heller.
