= The Star (Ketchikan, Alaska) =

- U.S. National Register of Historic Places
- U.S. Historic district – Contributing property
- Alaska Heritage Resources Survey
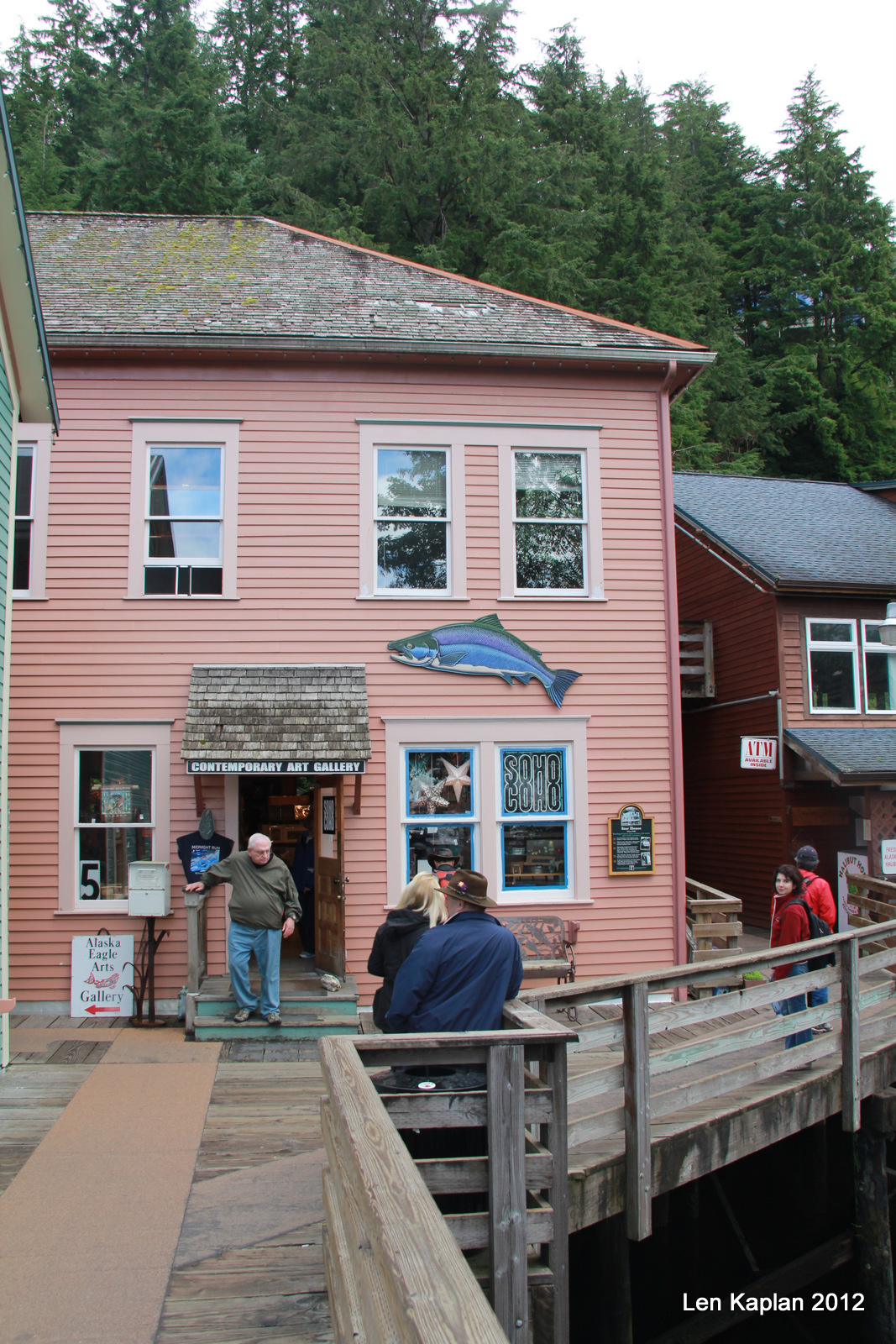

- Location within Alaska
- Location: 5 Creek Street, Ketchikan, Alaska
- Coordinates: 55°20′33″N 131°38′33″W
- Area: less than one acre
- Built: 1917
- Part of: Creek Street Historic District (ID14000454)
- NRHP reference No.: 93000336
- AHRS No.: KET-163

Significant dates
- Added to NRHP: April 26, 1993
- Designated CP: August 6, 2014

The Star is a historic commercial building at 5 Creek Street in Ketchikan, Alaska, United States. It is the only one of a once-numerous collection of brothels that famously lined Creek Street to retain its historical integrity, and was one of the largest in the city.

== History ==
The Star's origins (like those of other brothels on Creek Street) lay in a 1903 city ordinance banning brothels from the city center, after which those businesses began building in "Indian Town", in what is now Creek Street on stilts over the north bank of Ketchikan Creek. Winding into the hills above Creek Street is Married Man's Way, a trail used by patrons of the brothels to escape raids. Its name derives from the star inlaid in the center of the wooden dance floor.

The Star was built as a modest gable-roofed structure in 1903, not long after the ordinance was passed, and was enlarged in 1910 and again in 1917 to achieve its present size, probably whilst owned by Mattie Wilkes. The extensions included a dance hall.

"Black Mary" bought the house in 1917 for $4,000. Mary was a large woman who was affectionately known as "mama". She had owned a brothel in Petersburg, Alaska before buying the Star. One of her prostitutes from Petersburg, Dolly Arthur, worked at the Star before opening her own house at 42 Creek Street. With her health failing, Mary sold the house to Thelma Baker in 1924. Less than a year later Mary died.

Thelma Baker had been born Linda Ruth McCowan in 1892 in Washington state. She was described as a thin mulatto with a good head for business. Despite police raids, the Star and Creek Street in general, served alcohol during Prohibition. This attracted fishermen to stop at Ketchikan and not only did they visit the Star and the other brothels in Creek Street, but spent money in the town on supplies and repairs. The brothels were generally tolerated because of the cash income to the town.

The Star continued as a brothel with a few brief closures until WW2. Prostitution was banned in Ketchikan during the war years. The women returned in 1946 but did not restrict themselves to Creek Street. In 1953, the city banned all prostitution and the Star closed.

Thelma Baker continued to live in the house alone. For a short time in the 1960s, the ground floor was used as a woodworking shop. On August 7, 1972, the building caught fire. The fire had started from an oil stove in Baker's apartment. Baker, by then 80 years of age, and her dog died in the fire.

== Restoration ==
The building stood derelict until it was restored in 1991 by Steve Reeves and Karen Wolfred. The restoration kept as many of the original features as possible, including the maple dancefloor, which was sanded back to its former glory.

The building was opened as an art gallery by Ray and Michelle Troll. The upper floor is used as a luxury suite, part of the "Inn at Creek Street".

The building was listed on the National Register of Historic Places in 1993 and was included as a contributing property to Creek Street Historic District in 2014.

== See also ==
- National Register of Historic Places listings in Ketchikan Gateway Borough, Alaska
