= Star Island =

Star Island may refer to:

== Islands ==
=== United States ===
- Star Island (New Hampshire), one of the Isles of Shoals, New Hampshire
- Star Island (Miami Beach), a neighborhood and artificial island in the city of Miami Beach
- Star Island, Minnesota, an island in Cass Lake
- Star Island, Rhode Island, an island in Providence County
- Star Island, New York, an island in Lake Montauk on Long Island

=== Worldwide ===
- Star Island, Ontario, an island in Lake Kabenung in Northern Ontario, Canada
- Star Island, Turks and Caicos Islands, a man-made island adjacent to Mangrove Cay, northeast of Providenciales, Turks and Caicos Islands

== In literature ==
- Star Island (novel), a 2010 novel by Carl Hiaasen
