= Star Township =

Star Township may refer to:

- Star Township, Coffey County, Kansas
- Star Township, Antrim County, Michigan
- Star Township, Pennington County, Minnesota
- Star Township, Montgomery County, North Carolina, in Montgomery County, North Carolina
- Star Township, Bowman County, North Dakota, in Bowman County, North Dakota
- Star Township, Clay County, South Dakota, in Clay County, South Dakota
