= Star Air =

Star Air may refer to the following airlines:

- Maersk Air Cargo, a Danish cargo airline owned by Maersk formerly known as Star Air
- Star Air (India), an Indian commuter airline
- Star Air (Indonesia), a defunct Indonesian airline
- Star Air (South Africa), a South African charter airline
- Star Air Service, a defunct airline from Alaska, predecessor of Alaska Airlines

== See also ==
- East Star Airlines, a defunct Chinese airline
- XL Airways France, a defunct French airline formerly named Star Airlines
