= Star Theatre =

Star Theatre or Star Theater may refer to:

== Australia ==
=== New South Wales ===
- Star Theatre, Bondi Junction, a former cinema in Sydney
- Star Theatre, Sydney, within The Star casino, Sydney, New South Wales

=== South Australia ===
- New Star Theatre, Goodwood, Adelaide, a cinema, later Capri Theatre, often referred to as the Star
- Star Theatre, several cinemas owned by D. Clifford Theatres in Adelaide, South Australia, in the early 20th century
- Star Theatres, Hilton, Adelaide, South Australia, comprising two live performance spaces

=== Elsewhere in Australia ===
- Star Theatre, Darwin, Northern Territory, a cinema destroyed by Cyclone Tracy in 1974
- Star Theatre, Invermay, Tasmania, a former cinema
- Star Theatre, Perth, now the Luna Leederville, a cinema complex

== United States ==
- Star Theatres, a movie theatre chain
- Star Theatre (La Puente, California), originally Puente Theatre, demolished in 2019
- Star Theater (Weiser, Idaho), listed on the National Register of Historic Places in Washington County
- Star Theatre (Broadway), New York City, originally Wallack's Theatre, demolished in 1901
  - Star Theatre (film), a short documentary about the demolition of the theatre
- Star Theatre (New York City, built 1901), also known as The New Star Theatre, Broadway playhouse active 1902–1908
- Star Theater (Portland, Oregon), silent film and burlesque theater
- Star Theatre (Price, Utah), property listed on the National Register of Historic Places in Carbon County
- Star Theater (Spokane, Washington), concert venue within the Spokane Veterans Memorial Arena in Spokane, Washington
- Star Theatre (Argyle, Wisconsin), listed on the National Register of Historic Places in Lafayette County

== Other countries ==
- Star Theatre (Kitchener, Ontario), Canada
- Star Theatre, Kolkata, India
- The Star Performing Arts Centre, Singapore
