= Starchild Productions =

Australian video production company

Starchild is a Sydney production company making drama and comedy for television, plus commercials, online content and music videos. Started in 2005, Starchild's achievements include AFI awards for their ABC comedy Review with Myles Barlow, winning the Optus MTV ONE80PROJECT with Dungoona, and ARIA and Grammy Award nominations for their music videos.

== List of notable works ==
=== 2011 ===
- This Week at Woolworths (commercials)
- Fresh Market Update (long-running series of Woolworths commercials)
- Free (Music video for Pete Murray)
- Always a Winner (Music video for Pete Murray)
- Our Ad (TV Commercial for The Starlight Foundation)

=== 2010 ===
- Review with Myles Barlow Series II (ABC TV comedy)
- MTV Snow Jam (Live concert produced in Thredbo, NSW)

=== 2009 ===
- Dungoona (1hr Drama) (Winner Optus MTV ONE80PROJECT)
- Last Day on Earth (ARIA-nominated Music Video for Kate Miller-Heidke)

=== 200 ===
- Review With Myles Barlow (ABC TV comedy)
- All Alone (Music video for Jackson Jackson)
- Goodnight, Bull Creek! (Music video for Bob Evans)

=== 2007 ===
- Chillout Classics (TVC) (Ministry of Sound)
- 17 Deaths (Music video) (for Lost Valentinos)
- Change Coming (Short film) (with Pie Full of Blackbirds)
- Tipped Hat (Music video for The Paper Scissors)

=== 2006 ===
- Liberacion (Music DVD for Petrol Records - Grammy Award nominated in 2008)
- Wok (Short film with Pie Full of Blackbirds)
