= Star Lake Township, Otter Tail County, Minnesota =

Star Lake Township, Minnesota
- Township
- Location of Star Lake Township, within Otter Tail County, Minnesota

- Location within the state of Minnesota Star Lake Township, Minnesota (the United States)
- Coordinates: 46°30′16″N 95°50′2″W
- Country: United States
- State: Minnesota
- County: Otter Tail

Area
  - Total: 35.8 sq mi (92.6 km^{2})
  - Land: 25.0 sq mi (64.8 km^{2})
  - Water: 10.7 sq mi (27.8 km^{2})
- Elevation: 1,332 ft (406 m)

Population (2020)
  - Total: 446
  - Density: 17.8/sq mi (6.88/km^{2})
- Time zone: UTC-6 (Central (CST))
  - Summer (DST): UTC-5 (CDT)
- FIPS code: 27-62554
- GNIS feature ID: 0665701
- Website: https://starlaketownship.org/

Star Lake Township is a township in Otter Tail County, Minnesota, United States. The population was 446 at the 2020 census.

Star Lake Township was organized in 1880.

== Geography ==
According to the United States Census Bureau, the township has a total area of 35.8 square miles (92.6 km^{2}), of which 25.0 square miles (64.8 km^{2}) is land and 10.8 square miles (27.8 km^{2}) (30.05%) is water.

== Demographics ==
At the 2000 census there were 410 people, 168 households, and 117 families in the township. The population density was 16.4 people per square mile (6.3/km^{2}). There were 483 housing units at an average density of 19.3/sq mi (7.5/km^{2}). The racial makeup of the township was 99.76% White, and 0.24% from two or more races. Hispanic or Latino of any race were 0.24%.

Of the 168 households 25.6% had children under the age of 18 living with them, 62.5% were married couples living together, 4.2% had a female householder with no husband present, and 29.8% were non-families. 28.6% of households were one person and 7.1% were one person aged 65 or older. The average household size was 2.44 and the average family size was 2.96.

The age distribution was 24.1% under the age of 18, 5.1% from 18 to 24, 23.7% from 25 to 44, 33.7% from 45 to 64, and 13.4% 65 or older. The median age was 43 years. For every 100 females, there were 121.6 males. For every 100 females age 18 and over, there were 123.7 males.

The median household income was $29,500 and the median family income was $31,875. Males had a median income of $23,750 versus $20,682 for females. The per capita income for the township was $20,736. About 7.7% of families and 9.0% of the population were below the poverty line, including 3.2% of those under age 18 and 10.1% of those age 65 or over.
