= Star FM (Kenya) =

Somali-language radio station in Kenya

Star FM is a privately owned radio station in Kenya and the country's oldest Somali-language broadcaster. Established in 2005, the station boasts of a listenership of millions of people in northern Kenya as well as the capital, Nairobi, and can also be heard across Somalia and southern parts of Ethiopia .

With its headquarters in Nairobi, Star FM has transmitter stations in Garissa, Dadaab, Wajir, Madogo in Tana River County and Mandera in the country's northeastern regions.

In Somalia, Star FM has stations in Mogadishu, Guriceel (89.5FM), Bulla Hawa/Dolow (92.5FM), El wak (89.5FM), Dhobley (Gedo Region) (89.5FM), Afmadow(89.5FM), Kismayo (89.5FM), Jowhar(97.0FM), Merca (97.0FM), Dhusamareeb (89.5FM), Beledweyne(88.5), Abud Waq (89.5FM), Bosasso (88.5FM) and Galkacyo (88.5FM).

The station broadcasts 24 hours a day across Kenya in Somali, English and Swahili and rebroadcasts programmes from BBC and VOA Somali Service as well as Radio Ergo. Star FM's programming consists of news, entertainment, political, business, sports and humanitarian programmes.

“When the station began to broadcast in 2005, the listeners in North Eastern happily identified with Star FM, calling it their own,” the station’s chairman Mohamud Abdullahi Sheikh told the Daily Nation.
