= Star Lake (Cook County, Minnesota) =

Lake in the state of Minnesota, United States

- Location within Minnesota
- Location: Cook County, Minnesota
- Coordinates: 47°54.5′N 90°39′W
- Type: lake

Star Lake is a lake in Cook County, Minnesota, in the United States.

Star Lake was probably so named from its roughly star-like outline.

== See also ==
- List of lakes in Minnesota
