= Situation, task, action, result =

Technique used by interviewers

The situation, task, action, result (STAR) method is an interviewing technique used by employers to evaluate job candidates by how they respond to behavioral and situational based interview questions.

== Description ==
The STAR method, which stands for Situation, Task, Action, and Result, is a structured technique used by employers to evaluate candidates by how they respond to behavioral and situational interview questions. It is one method of structured employment interviewing. It helps candidates provide clear, focused answers based on real-life examples and is widely used for its emphasis on problem-solving and measurable outcomes. This interview technique is suited for open-ended questions that ask candidates to describe their involvement in a specific situation.

- Situation: The interviewer wants you to present a recent challenging situation in which you found yourself.
- Task: What were you required to achieve? The interviewer will be looking to see what you were trying to achieve from the situation. Some performance development methods use “Target” rather than “Task”. Job interview candidates who describe a “Target” they set themselves instead of an externally imposed “Task” emphasize their own intrinsic motivation to perform and to develop their performance.
- Action: What did you do? The interviewer will be looking for information on what you did, why you did it and what the alternatives were.
- Result: What was the outcome of your actions? What did you achieve through your actions? Did you meet your objective? What did you learn from this experience? Have you used this learning since?

Common questions that the STAR technique can be applied to include conflict management, time management, problem solving and interpersonal skills.
