= Star FM (South Africa) =

Klerksdorp; South Africa
- Frequency: 102.9 MHz

Links
- Website: www.starfm.co.za

Star FM (102.9 MHz) is a South African community radio station based in Klerksdorp, City of Matlosana, Dr KK District Municipality DC40,(formerly Southern District municipality) named after Kenneth Kaunda the first President of Zambia, one of the four districts of the North West Province of the Republic of South Africa.

== Coverage areas ==
- The Southern District Municipality, which is located 65 km South west of Johannesburg, and borders Gauteng
- Potchefstroom
- Klerksdorp
- Ventersdorp
- Maquassi hills
- World wide via live streaming

== Broadcast languages ==
- Afrikaans
- Xhosa
- Tswana
- North Sotho
- English

== Broadcast time ==
- 24/7

== Target audience ==
- LSM Groups 3 - 9
- Age Group 18 - 34

== Programme format ==
- 60% Talk
- 40% Music
