= Misty Fjords National Monument =

Wilderness preserve in Alaska, US

- IUCN category Ib (wilderness area)
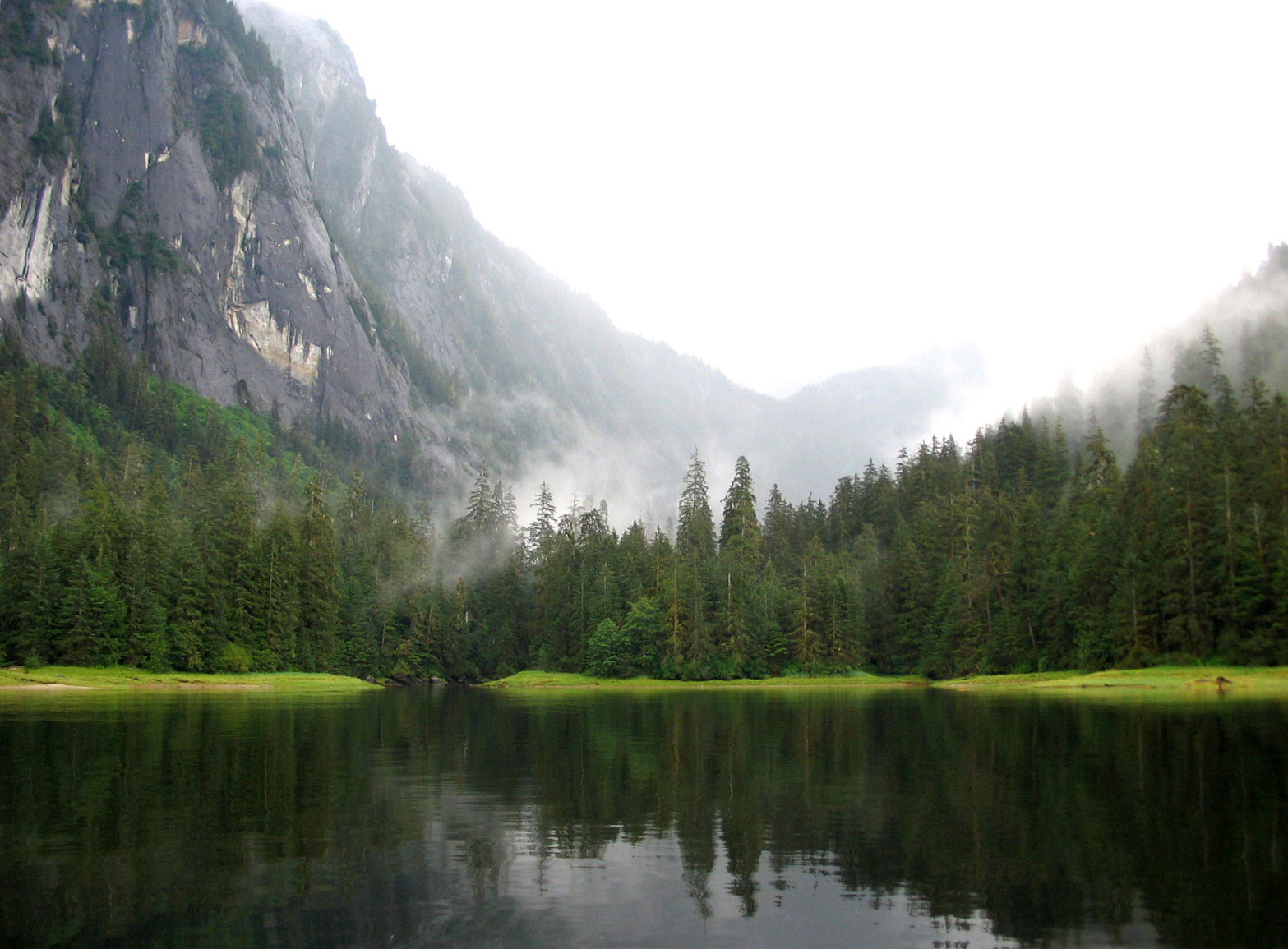
- One of the thousands of ocean inlets at Misty Fiords.

- Location within Alaska
- Interactive map of Misty Fjords National Monument
- Location: Ketchikan Gateway Borough, Alaska, United States
- Nearest city: Ketchikan, AK
- Coordinates: 55°37′18″N 130°36′26″W
- Area: 2,294,343 acres (928,488 ha)
- Established: December 1, 1978
- Governing body: U.S. Forest Service

U.S. National Monument

Misty Fjords National Monument (or Misty Fiords National Monument) is a national monument and wilderness area administered by the U.S. Forest Service as part of the Tongass National Forest. Misty Fiords is about 40 miles (64 km) east of Ketchikan, Alaska, along the Inside Passage coast in extreme southeastern Alaska, comprising 2,294,343 acres (928,488 ha) of Tongass National Forest in Alaska's Panhandle. All but 151,832 acres (61,444 ha) are designated as wilderness.

Congress reserved the remainder for the Quartz Hill molybdenum deposit, possibly the largest such mineral deposit in the world. The national monument was originally proclaimed by President Jimmy Carter in December 1978 as Misty Fiords National Monument, using the authorization of the Antiquities Act and became a part of an ongoing political struggle between the federal government and the State of Alaska over land use policy and authority that finally led to the Alaska National Interest Lands Conservation Act in 1980. In that law, it was statutorily established as Misty Fjords National Monument.

== Physical geography ==
John Muir compared the area with Yosemite Valley for its similar geology and glacial morphology. Light-colored granite, about 50 to 70 million years old (Eocene Epoch to Cretaceous Period) has been sculpted by glaciers that gouged deep U-shaped troughs throughout the monument. Many of the glacial valleys are filled with sea water and are called "canals", but they are not man-made in any way; the walls of these fjords are near-vertical and often rise 2,000 to 3,000 feet (600 to 900 m) above sea level, and drop 1,000 feet (300 m) below it.

Across from the Salmon River and Portland Canal and the settlement of Hyder, Alaska, small glaciers occupy high areas of the northeast part of the monument. Soule and Through Glaciers cover high plateaus and valleys in the Lincoln and Seward Mountains, where one peak rises to 6,250 feet (1,900 m) above sea level. Most mountain tops in the monument are in the 4,000 to 5,000 foot (1,200 to 1,500 m) elevation range. The tree line is usually around 2,700 feet (800 m).

== Ecology ==
Western hemlock, Sitka spruce and western red cedar dominate the prolific rainforest vegetation; wildlife in abundance includes both grizzly and black bears, many species of salmon, whales, mountain goats, and Sitka black-tailed deer.

== Visitor access ==
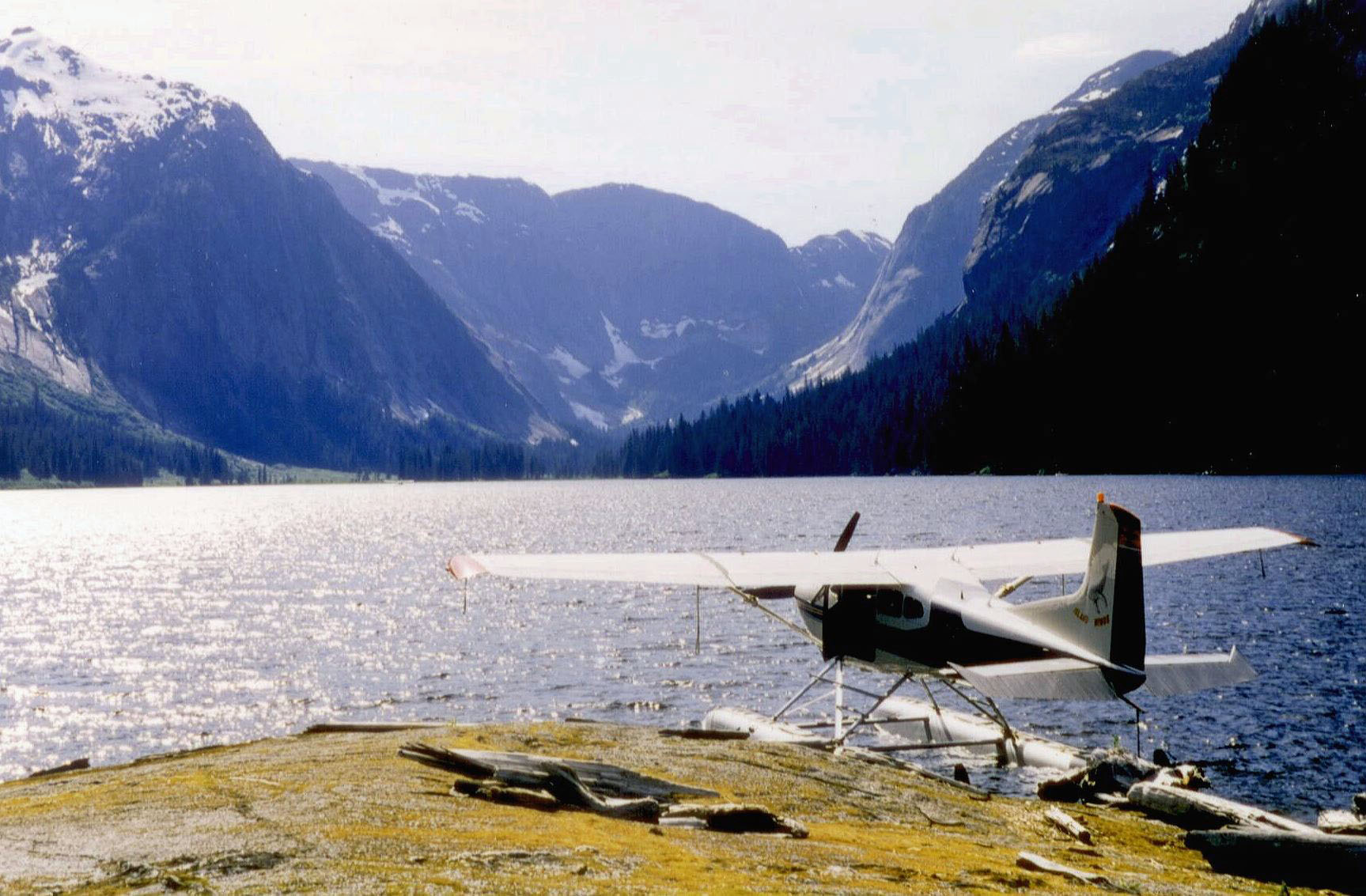
Some of the fjords, accessible by floatplane, have tiny islands that rise only a few feet above water level.

Because of the remoteness of the area, most visitors arrive by boat or aircraft from Ketchikan or Juneau, Alaska. More adventurous travelers choose an overnight charter service or spend days exploring by kayak.

== History ==
The region was first visited by Europeans in 1793 when George Vancouver explored up Behm Canal, the prominent sea-filled glacial trough along the western margin of the monument and separating it from Revillagigedo Island. Vancouver discovered New Eddystone Rock, a 237-foot (72 m) tall column of basalt in the middle of Behm Canal. It was formed within the past 5 million years by volcanic activity, evidence for which is scattered sparsely through the monument, including a lava flow high above Punchbowl Cove, and at Blue River in the far northern part of the monument near the Canada–US border.

== See also ==
- Alaska National Interest Lands Conservation Act
- Admiralty Island National Monument
- List of national monuments of the United States
