= Clover Pass School =

Historic building in Alaska, United States

- U.S. National Register of Historic Places
- Alaska Heritage Resources Survey
- Location within Alaska
- Location: Potter Road off Knudson Cove Road, Clover Pass, Alaska
- Coordinates: 55°28′22″N 131°47′32″W
- Area: 2.16 acres (0.87 ha)
- Built: 1947
- Architectural style: One-room school
- NRHP reference No.: 05000898
- AHRS No.: KET-000756
- Added to NRHP: August 22, 2005

The Clover Pass School is a historic school building in Ketchikan Gateway Borough, Alaska. It is located 16 miles (26 km) north of the city of Ketchikan, at the junction of Potter and Knudson Cove Roads. The small one-room wood-frame structure was built in 1947, and was used as a one-room school until 1961. It thereafter was used as a local community center and is now owned by Historic Ketchikan (although the land on which it sits is owned by the federal government and administered by the United States Bureau of Land Management).

The building was listed on the National Register of Historic Places in 2005.

== See also ==
- National Register of Historic Places listings in Ketchikan Gateway Borough, Alaska
