= New Eddystone Rock =

Island in the Alaska, United States

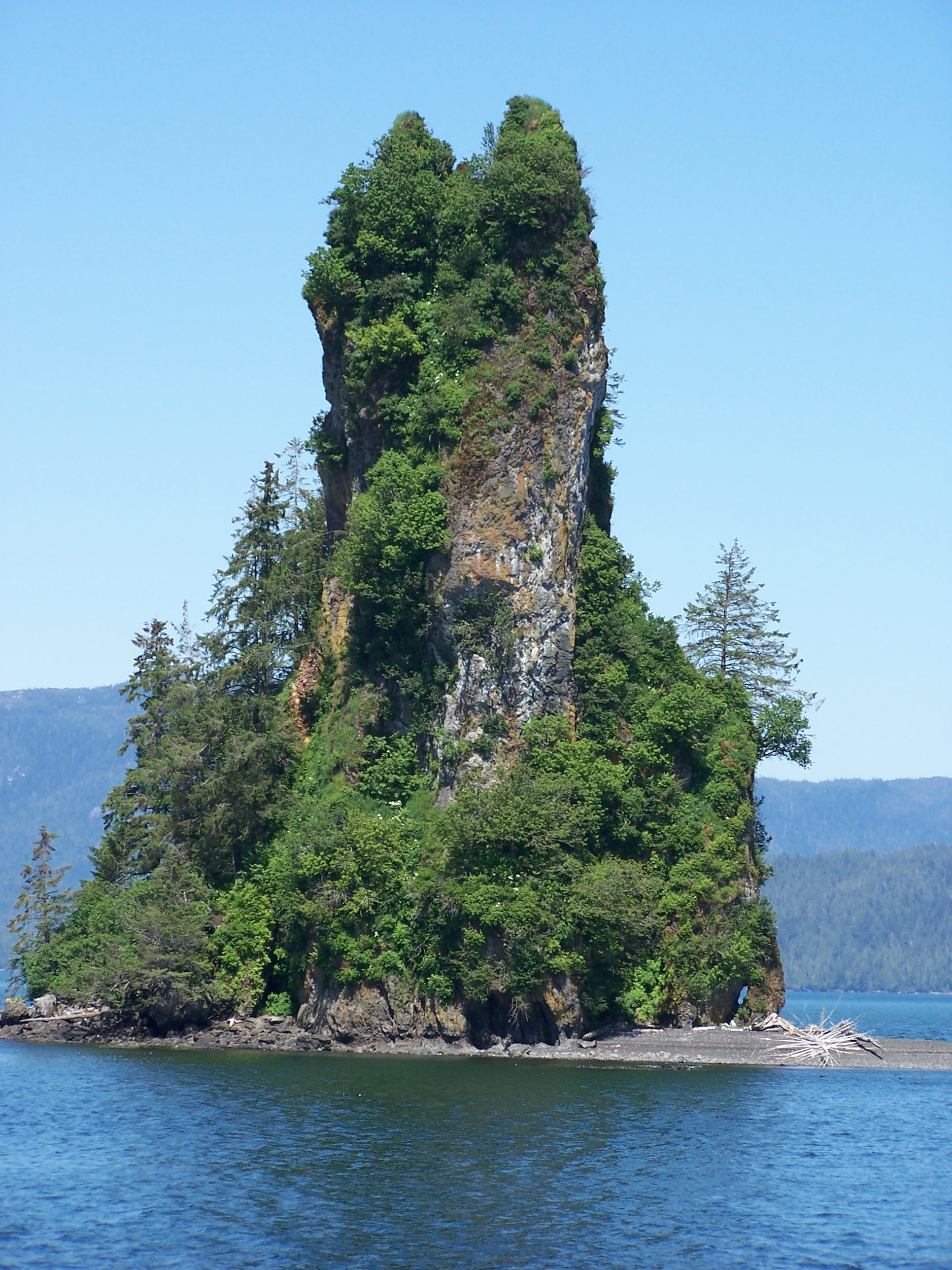

- Location within Alaska

Geography
- Location: Behm Canal
- Coordinates: 55°30′13″N 130°56′09″W
- Highest elevation: 237 ft (72.2 m)

Administration
- United States
- State: Alaska
- Borough: Ketchikan Gateway

New Eddystone Rock an Alaskan island located in Behm Canal, about 40 miles (64 km) east of Ketchikan. It is a pillar of basalt.

== Geology ==
During the last ice age, Southeast Alaska was covered by a thick ice sheet. The weight of the ice pressed down and compressed the underlying crust, including the area that is now Behm Canal. As the ice melted at the beginning of the current interglacial period, this weight was reduced. The Earth's crust responded by flexing upward, a process known as isostatic rebound. This movement broke the rock and created a New Eddystone volcano that erupted 15,000 to 13,800 years ago.

The volcano rises from the bottom of Behm Canal, about 850 feet (260 m) below sea level. The island stands to 237 feet (72 m) above sea level, giving the volcano a total height of over 1,000 feet (300 m). While the portion of the volcano below sea level is somewhat cone-shaped, wave action over the millennia has eroded all the rock above sea level except the dense, spire-shaped volcanic plug.

Bathymetric studies of the floor of Behm Canal show that New Eddystone was not the only volcano that emerged as the crust buckled. Four other vents have been identified. Two are dome-shaped, suggesting that they erupted below the glacial ice sheet and were rounded off as the ice flowed over them. The other two, and New Eddystone Rock, are more pointed showing that they had never been overridden by ice. Of the five identified volcanic vents in Behm Canal, only New Eddystone Rock rises above sea level.

The tidal range in Behm canal exceeds 20 feet (6.1 m). Since much of New Eddystone Rock is low-lying beach, the size of the island above the water varies considerably with the tides.

== History ==
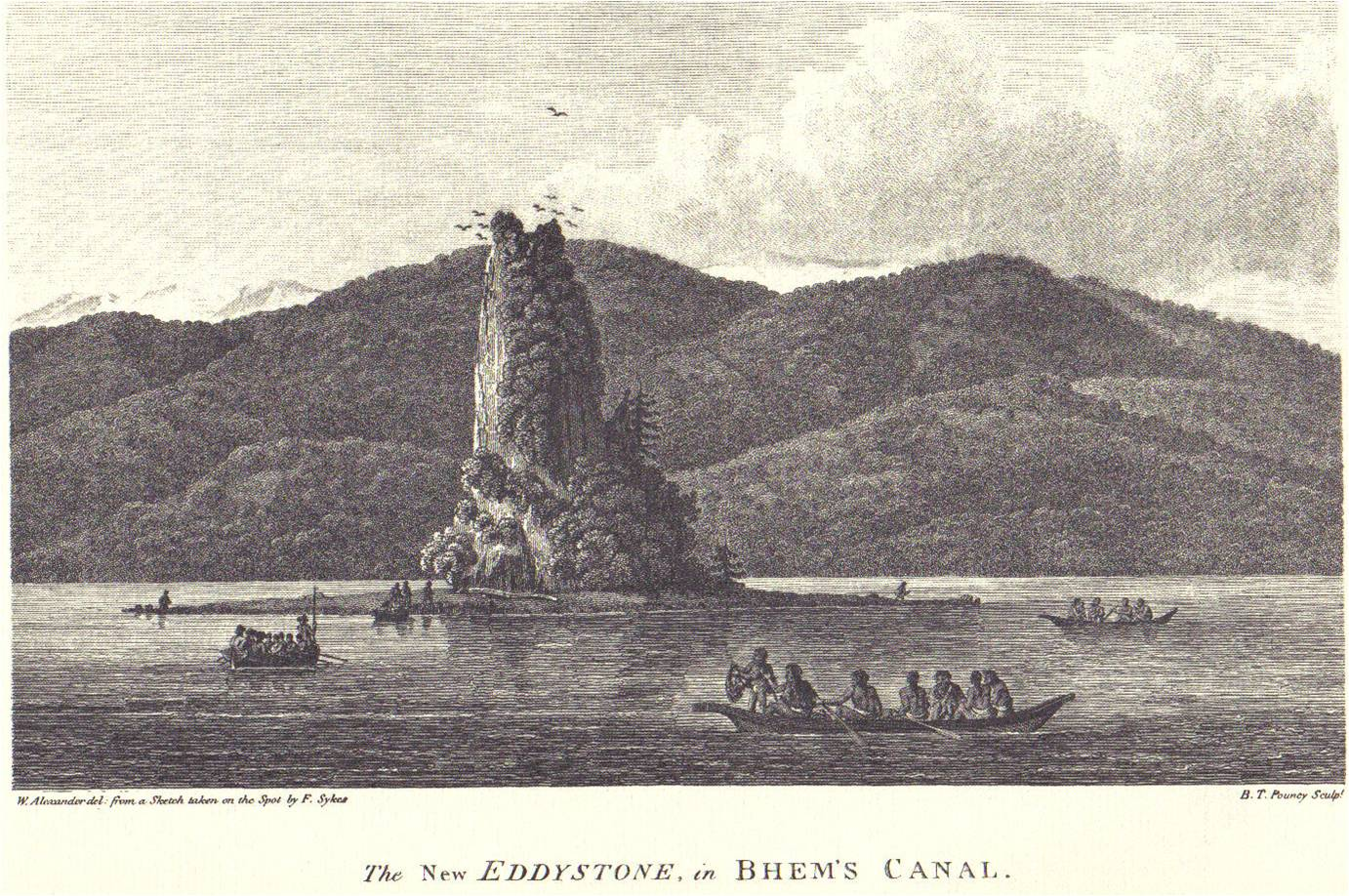
1798 engraving of New Eddystone Rock in George Vancouver's report to King George III.

How the native Tlingit people discovered the island, their name for it, and what role it played in their lives prior to European contact is lost to history.

The first European to observe New Eddystone Rock was Captain George Vancouver. He was dispatched by the British Admiralty in 1791 to survey the northwest coast of North America. By July 1793 Vancouver's multi-year voyage brought him to what is now Observatory Inlet, British Columbia. He anchored his ships there and then led a two-boat surveying team north along the shore. He commanded HMS Discovery's yawl, and Lieutenant Peter Puget commanded Discovery's launch.

Exploring north through Behm Canal, Vancouver reached New Eddystone Rock on Friday, August 9, 1793. He beached his boats there. In his report to King George III, he wrote,

We stopped to breakfast and whilst we were thus engaged, three small canoes, with about a dozen of the natives, landed and approached us unarmed, and with the utmost good humor accepted such presents as were offered to them, making signs in return, that they had brought nothing to dispose of, but inviting us in the most pressing manner to their habitations

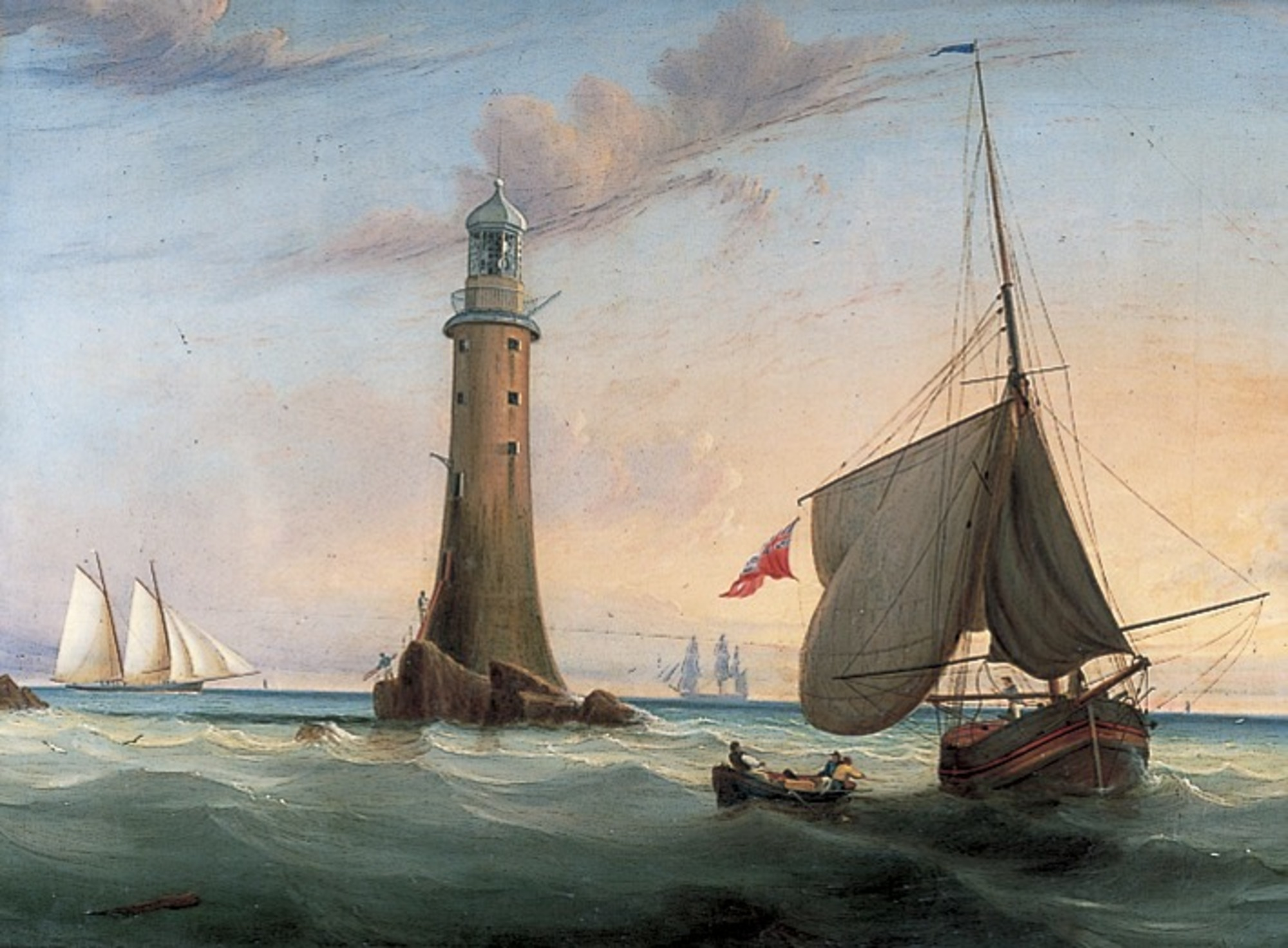
The Eddystone lighthouse as it appeared in Vancouver's time

Vancouver chose not to accept the invitation, but instead continued exploring north. He named the island for the Eddystone lighthouse off Plymouth, England, a pillar that also erupted from a narrow base at sea level.

Much of Southeast Alaska, including New Eddystone Rock, was incorporated into Tongass National Forest through a series of proclamations by President Theodore Roosevelt. On December 1, 1978 President Jimmy Carter proclaimed a portion of the Tongass National Forest to be Misty Fjords National Monument, which included New Eddystone Rock. In 1980 Congress enacted the Alaska National Interest Lands Conservation Act, which provided wilderness protection to most of the national monument. The island is currently managed by the U.S. Forest Service.
