= Loring, Alaska =

Unincorporated community in Alaska, United States

Loring, Alaska, Naha Bay Kax̱.àan
- Census-designated place
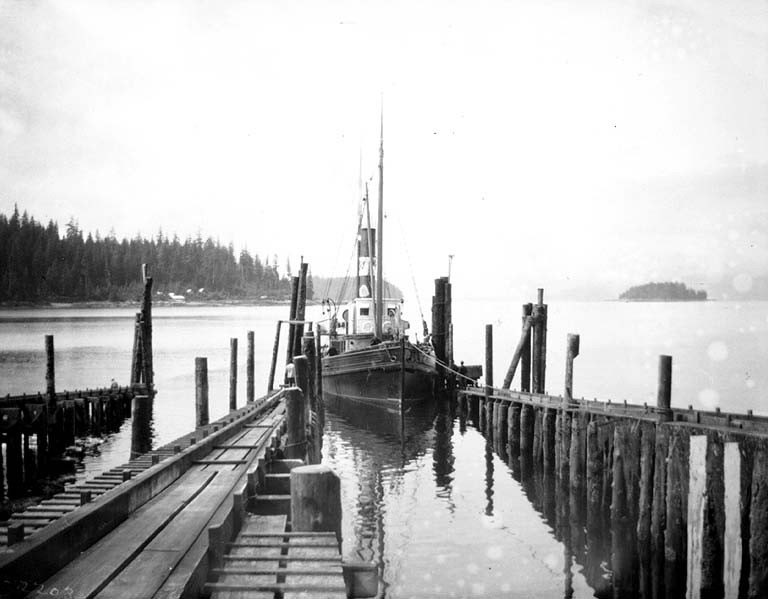
- S.S. Kayak, a steamship, entering the slip at a cannery dock in Loring, July 1904

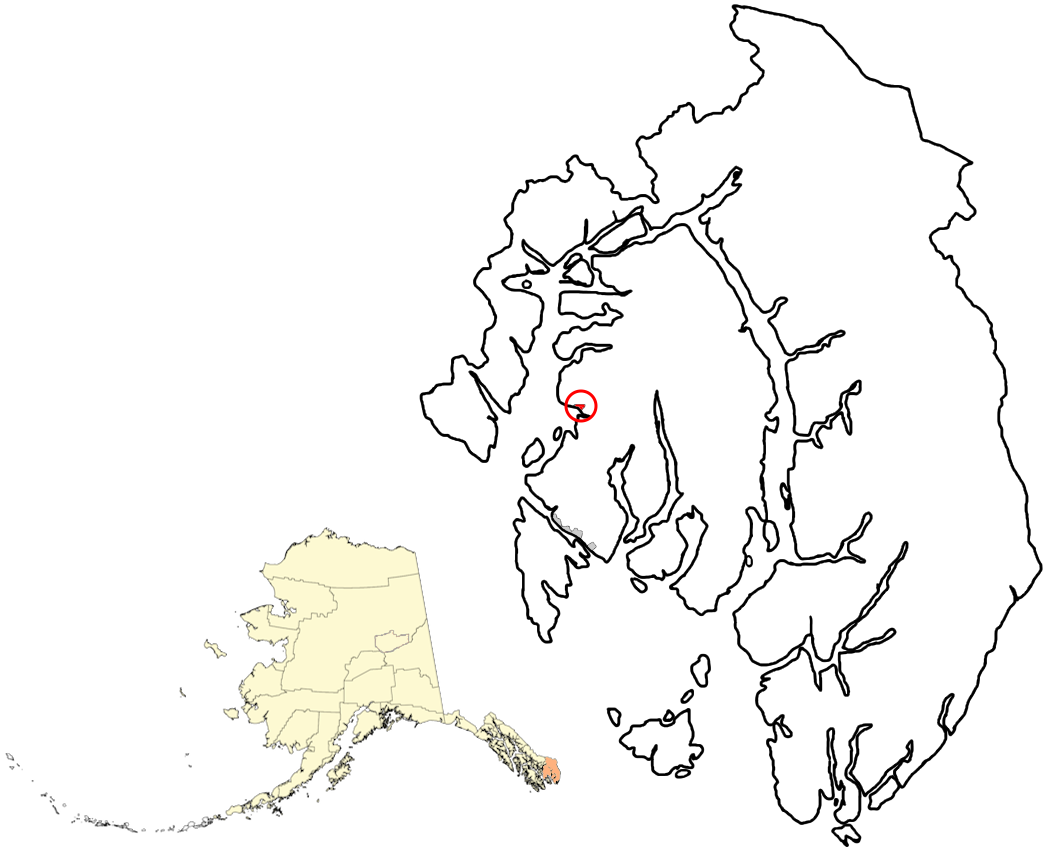
- Location in Ketchikan Gateway Borough, Alaska
- Coordinates: 55°36′11″N 131°38′13″W
- Country: United States
- State: Alaska
- Borough: Ketchikan Gateway

Government
  - Borough mayor: David Landis
  - State senator: Bert Stedman (R)
  - State rep.: Dan Ortiz (I)

Area
  - Total: 0.63 sq mi (1.63 km^{2})
  - Land: 0.55 sq mi (1.43 km^{2})
  - Water: 0.077 sq mi (0.20 km^{2})

Population (2020)
  - Total: 0
  - Density: 0/sq mi (0/km^{2})
- FIPS code: 02-45020

Loring (Lingít: Kax̱.àan) was established in 1885 with the first post office in the District of Alaska and is a census-designated place (CDP) in Ketchikan Gateway Borough in the U.S. state of Alaska. As of the 2020 census, the population is 0, down from 4 at the 2010 census, although the number increases in summer months.

Located due north of downtown Ketchikan on Revillagigedo Island, Loring was once Ketchikan's rival as the service center for the area's fishing and timber industries.

== Geography ==
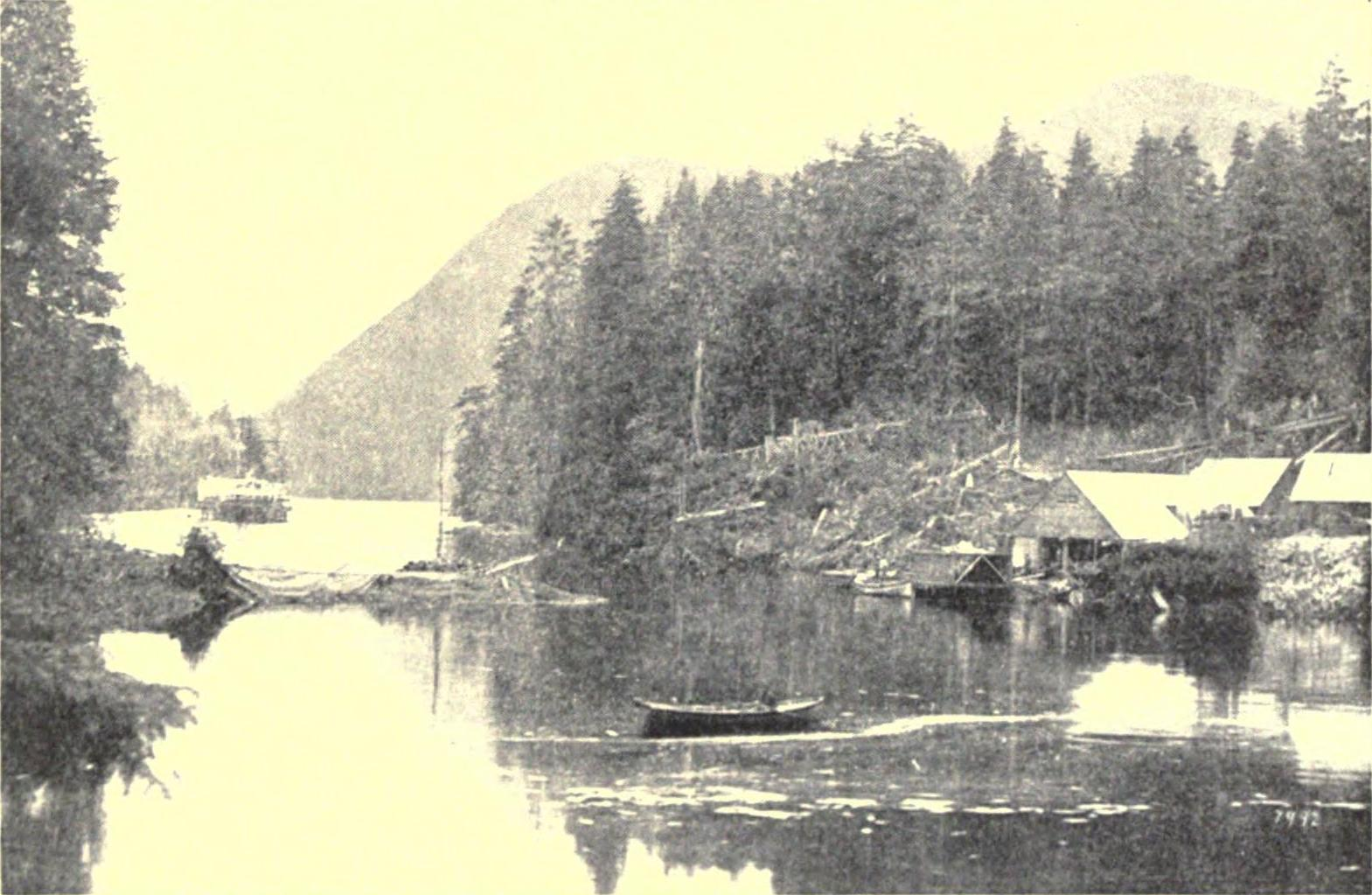
The Loring Saltery as it appeared ca. 1887, located near the Naha Rapids. The townsite of Loring is located behind it at the base of the mountain in the background. The side wheel steamer Ancon is in the upper left. It wrecked on Loring's beach in August 1889

Loring is located at 55°36′11″N 131°38′13″W, on the western shore of Revillagigedo Island, approximately 15 miles (24 km) north of Ketchikan as the crow flies. It is located on the northern shore of Naha Bay, an arm of Behm Canal.

According to the United States Census Bureau, the CDP has a total area of 0.62 square miles (1.6 km^{2}), of which 0.54 square miles (1.4 km^{2}) is land and 0.077 square miles (0.2 km^{2}), or 12.27%, is water.

== Demographics ==
Historical population
Census	Pop.	Note	%±
1890	200		—
1900	168		−16.0%
2010	4		—
2020	0		−100.0%
U.S. Decennial Census

Loring first appeared on the 1890 U.S. Census as an unincorporated fishing village and cannery. It consisted of 200 residents, of which a majority (120) were native (presumably Tlingit), 51 were Asian (Chinese), 27 were white, and 2 were Creole (mixed native and Russian). This population figure also included adjacent native fishing camps. It returned in 1900 with 168 residents, but the census did not provide a racial breakdown. Although the cannery and post office at Loring continued to operate until 1930 and 1936, respectively, it did not report on the census again from after 1900 until 110 years later, in 2010. It was made a census-designated place (CDP), with just 4 residents (2 of 2 or more races, 1 Native American & 1 White resident).
