= Cone Island, Alaska =

Island in Alaska, United States

Cone Island
- Location within Alaska

Geography
- Coordinates: 55.245104°N 131.321099°W
- Archipelago: Alexander Archipelago

Administration
- United States
- State: Alaska

Cone Island is a small island in the Alexander Archipelago of Alaska, situated south of Revillagigedo Island near Ketchikan.
