= Clover Pass, Alaska =

Unincorporated community in Alaska, US

Coordinates: 55°28′20″N 131°47′30″W

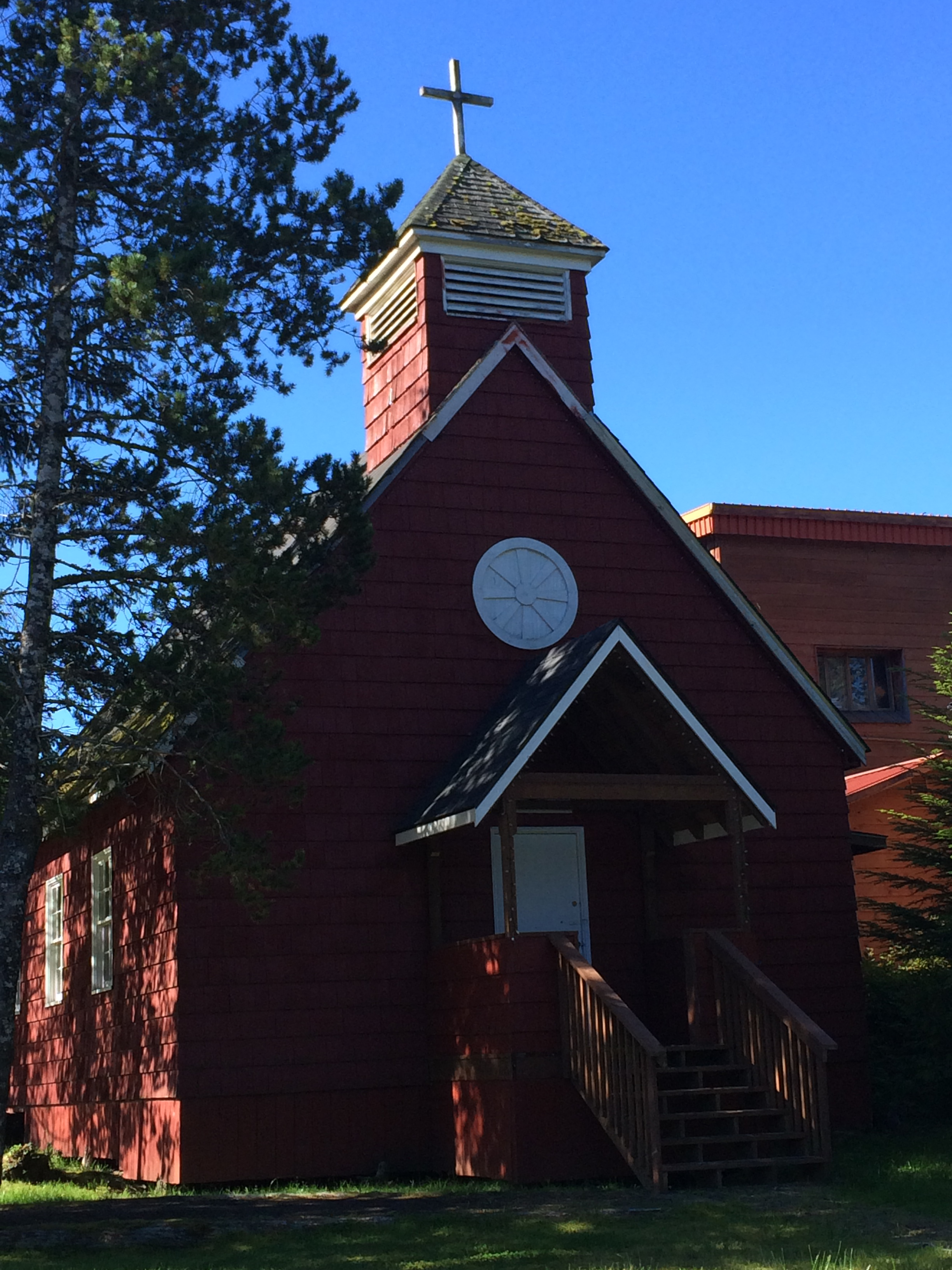
Clover Pass Christian School next to Clover Pass Church

Clover Pass is an unincorporated community in Ketchikan Gateway Borough, Alaska. Workers organized and built the Clover Pass School in 1947 and it was used as a community center in the 1960s. Wards Cove was a shipwreck in the area after an engine fire sank it in 1929. The area, on Clover Passage, includes a marina and is popular for sportfishing as well as kayaking and sailing. It is home to Clover Pass Resort including campsites.

Clover Pass is by Clover Passage at Potter Point.
