= Mount Vancouver (New Zealand) =

Mountain in New Zealand

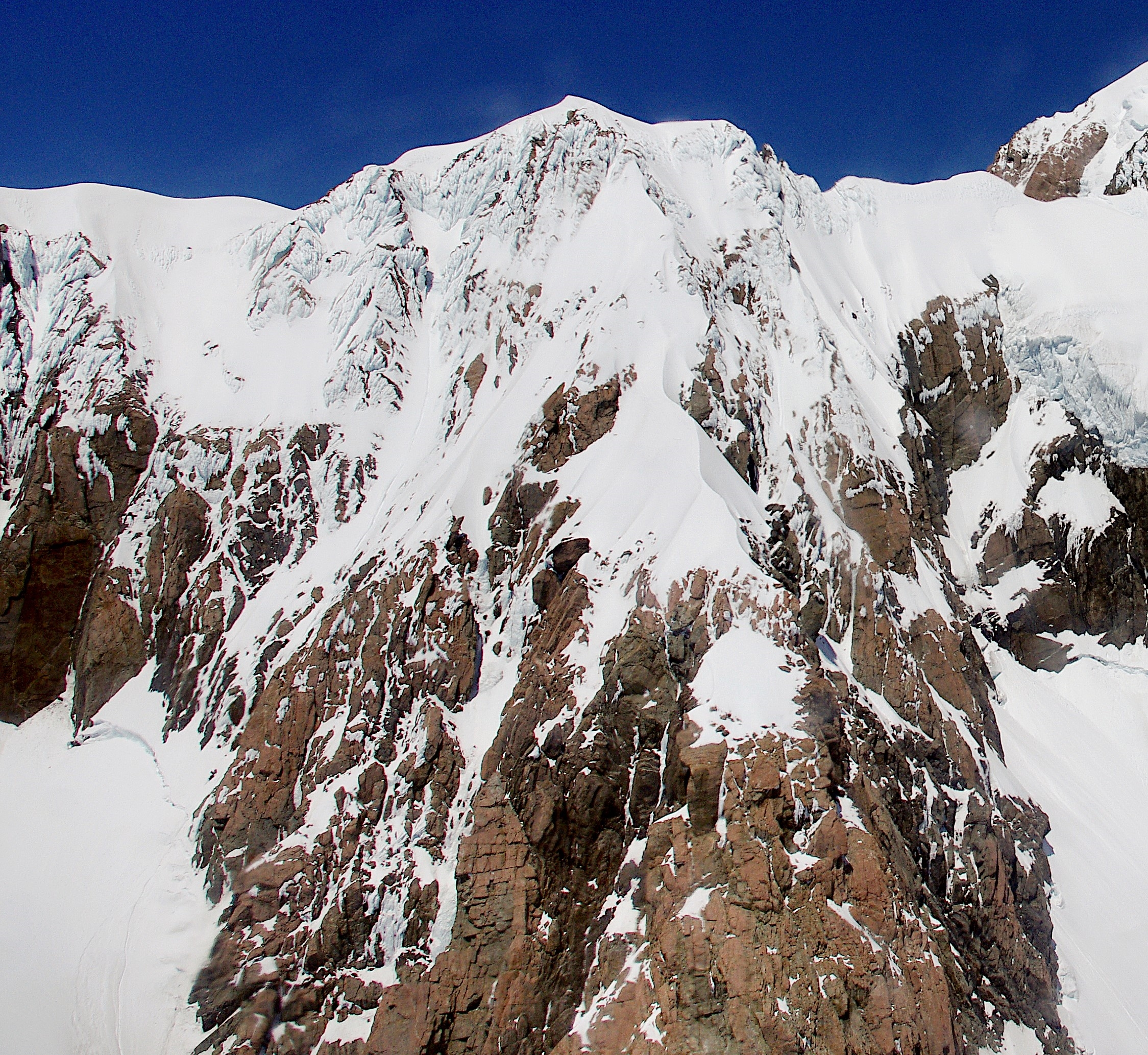
- Aerial view of northwest aspect

Highest point
- Elevation: 3,309 m (10,856 ft)
- Prominence: 20 m (66 ft)
- Coordinates: 43°35′06″S 170°08′30″E

Geography
- Location within New Zealand
- Location: Location in New Zealand
- Parent range: Southern Alps / Kā Tiritiri o te Moana

Mount Vancouver is a peak in the Southern Alps. At 3,309 metres (10,856 feet), it is New Zealand's fourth-highest named summit. It is an elevation on the ridge leading north from Aoraki / Mount Cook (3,724 m), between Mount Dampier (3,440 m) and the Clarke Saddle (2,978 m).

The peak is named after Captain George Vancouver, who was part of the second voyage of James Cook in 1773 and who returned in 1791 as commander of the Vancouver Expedition. The New Zealand Geographic Board adopted the name Mount Vancouver in November 1953.

== See also ==
- List of mountains of New Zealand by height
