= Couverden Island =

Island in Alaska, United Statess#

Coordinates: 58°12′01″N 135°04′31″W

Couverden Island is a small island located at the western entrance of Lynn Canal in Alaska. The first European to see it was Joseph Whidbey in 1794, master of the Discovery during George Vancouver's 1792-1794 exploration of the Pacific Northwest. The south point of the island was named by Vancouver Point Couverden, "which I called after the seat of my ancestors". The name was apparently later transferred to the island. The island is located in Haines Borough in southeastern Alaska.
