= Ward Cove, Alaska =

Unincorporated community in the state of Alaska, United States

- Unincorporated community
- Location within the state of Alaska
- Coordinates: 55°24′43″N 131°43′22″W
- Country: United States
- State: Alaska
- Borough: Ketchikan Gateway

Government
  - Borough mayor: David Landis
  - State senator: Bert Stedman (R)
  - State rep.: Dan Ortiz (I)
- Elevation: 164 ft (50 m)
- Time zone: UTC-9 (Alaska (AKST))
  - Summer (DST): UTC-8 (AKDT)
- ZIP Code: 99928
- GNIS feature ID: 1415612

Ward Cove (previously, Wacker, Wacker City, and Wards Cove) is an unincorporated community in Ketchikan Gateway Borough, Alaska, United States. Its elevation is 164 feet (50 m). It has a post office with the ZIP Code 99928.

== Geography ==
This village is an extension of the settlement area of Ketchikan northwest along the highway. The settlement lies on the northern shore of Ward Cove, at the southwestern end of Revillagigedo Island, 4.5 miles (7.2 km) northwest of Ketchikan.

== History ==
A saltery was established in Ward Cove in 1883–84 by W. W. Waud. Eugene Wacker was the first postmaster of the Wacker post office, which was established 1920. The post office name was changed to Wards Cove in 1951 and then to Ward Cove in 1954. In 2007, the post office was named in honor of Alice R. Brusich, who served as postmaster from 1954 to 1985. The village population was 57 at the 1930 census. The name "Ward Cove" was declared official in 1966 by the Board on Geographic Names.

== Tourism ==
Ward Cove is the location of a floating cruise ship dock that can accommodate two large ships. The pier went into operation in August 2021 as restrictions on cruise ships as a result of the COVID-19 pandemic began to ease. Norwegian Cruise Line invested in the project which is called the Mill at Ward Cove, and has priority docking rights there. Free bus service to Ketchikan is available to passengers who disembark there.

== Demographics ==
Historical population
Census	Pop.	Note	%±
1930	57		—
1960	69		—
1970	105		52.2%
U.S. Decennial Census

Ward Cove first appeared on the 1930 U.S. Census as the unincorporated village of "Wacker City." In 1940, the census bureau listed all settlements outside of the incorporated cities of Ketchikan and Saxman that could be reached by road on Revillagigedo Island as "Tongass Highway System", which had 494 residents. It did not report in 1950. In 1960, it returned as Wards Cove. In 1970, it was shortened to Ward Cove. In 1980, Ward Cove along with 6 other locales (Mud Bay, Peninsula Point, Port Higgins, Refuge Cove, Shoreline Drive & Tongass Highway System) were placed into the newly created census-designated place (CDP) of "North Tongass Highway", which had 1,722 residents. In 1990, it and all 6 other CDP's within Ketchikan Gateway Borough were dissolved (which contained 3,556 residents as of 1980). Aside from a southeastern portion of the former North Tongass Highway CDP being annexed into the city of Ketchikan, most of these locales, including Ward Cove, have not been counted within a city or CDP since 1980.
