= Revillagigedo Island =

Island in Alexander Archipelago, Alaska, US

Revillagigedo
- Location within Alaska

Geography
- Coordinates: 55°35′N 131°20′W
- Archipelago: Alexander Archipelago
- Area: 1,063.65 sq mi (2,754.8 km^{2})
- Length: 50 mi (80 km)
- Width: 35 mi (56 km)
- Highest elevation: 4,592 ft (1399.6 m)
- Highest point: Mt. Reid

Administration
- United States
- State: Alaska
- Borough: Ketchikan Gateway Borough

Demographics
- Population: 13,948 (2020)
- Pop. density: 5.06/km^{2} (13.11/sq mi)

Revillagigedo Island (Spanish: Isla Revillagigedo, IPA: [reˈβiʝa xiˈxeðo], English: /rɛˌvijəhiˈheɪðoʊ/ rheh-vee-yə-hee-HAY-dhoh, locally Revilla, /rəˈvɪlə/) is an island in the Alexander Archipelago in Ketchikan Gateway Borough of the southeastern region of the U.S. state of Alaska. Running about 89 km (50 mi) north-south and 48 km (35 mi) east-west, it is 2,754.835 km^{2} (1,063.648 mi^{2}) in area, making it the 12th largest island in the United States and the 170th largest island in the world. Its center is located near 55°38′03″N 131°17′51″W.

The island is separated from the Alaska mainland to the east by Behm Canal, from Prince of Wales Island to the west by the Clarence Strait, and from Annette Island to the south by Revillagigedo Channel and Nichols Passage. The island is traditional Tlingit territory, and by the nineteenth century was divided between the Saanyaa Ḵwáan and Taantʼa Ḵwáan tribes or subdivisions. The first European recorded as having sighted it was Spanish explorer Jacinto Caamaño in 1792; it was named the following year by British naval officer George Vancouver. for Juan Vicente de Güemes, 2nd Count of Revillagigedo, then viceroy of New Spain (Mexico).

The island's population was 13,948 as of the 2000 census. The only cities on the island are Ketchikan and Saxman, although the unincorporated community of Ward Cove and the historical community of Loring are also on the island. The principal industries are fishing, canning, logging and tourism. In addition to the cities, several logging communities are based on barges, which move about the waterways. These serve the unconnected system of logging roads that dot the island and have access to waterfront.
