= George Vancouver =

Royal Navy officer and explorer (1757–1798)

Captain George Vancouver
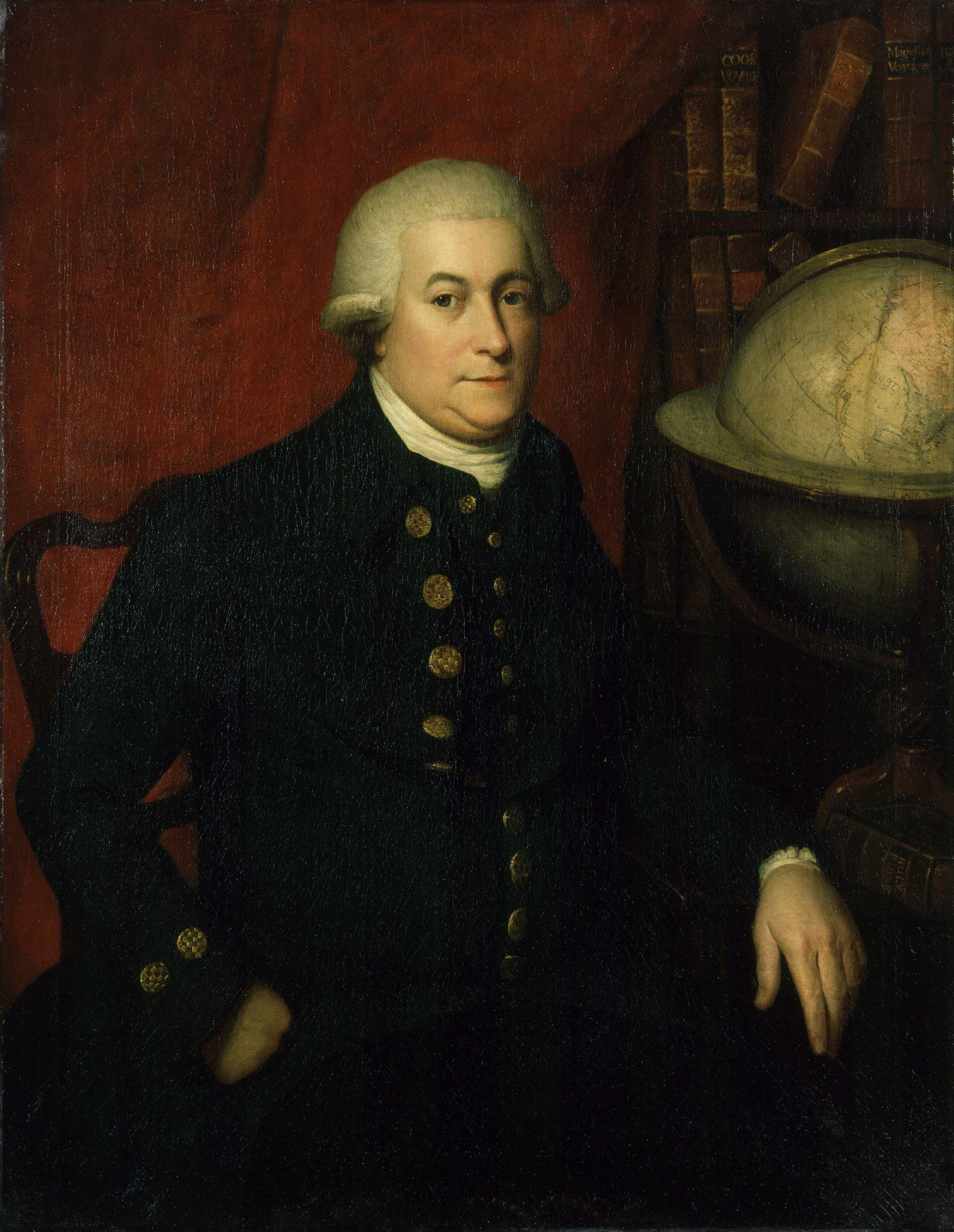
- Possible portrait of Vancouver
- Born: 22 June 1757; King's Lynn, Norfolk, England
- Died: 10 May 1798 (aged 40) Petersham, Surrey, England
- Allegiance: Great Britain
- Branch: Royal Navy
- Service years: 1771–c. 1795
- Rank: Captain
- Commands: HMS Discovery

Captain George Vancouver (22 June 1757 – 10 May 1798) was a Royal Navy officer and explorer best known for leading the Vancouver Expedition, which explored and charted North America's northwestern Pacific Coast regions, including the coasts of what became the Canadian province of British Columbia and the U.S. states of Alaska, Washington, Oregon and California. The expedition also explored the Hawaiian Islands and the southwest coast of Australia.

Various places named for Vancouver include Vancouver Island, the city of Vancouver in British Columbia, Vancouver River on the Sunshine Coast of British Columbia, Vancouver, Washington, in the United States, Mount Vancouver on the Canadian–US border between Yukon and Alaska, and New Zealand's fourth-highest mountain, also Mount Vancouver.

== Early life ==
Vancouver was born on 22 June 1757 in the seaport town of King's Lynn in Norfolk, England. He was the sixth and youngest child of John Jasper Vancouver, a Dutch-born deputy collector of customs, and Bridget Berners. The surname Vancouver comes from Coevorden, Drenthe province, Netherlands (Koevern in Dutch Low Saxon).

== Career ==
=== Royal Navy ===
In 1771, at age 13, Vancouver entered the Royal Navy as a "young gentleman", a future candidate for midshipman. He was nominally classified as an able seaman (AB), but sailed as one of the midshipmen aboard HMS Resolution, on James Cook's second voyage (1772–1775) searching for Terra Australis. He also sailed with Cook's third voyage (1776–1780), this time aboard Resolution's companion ship, HMS Discovery (1774), and was present during the first European sighting and exploration of the Hawaiian Islands.

Upon his return to Britain in October 1780, Vancouver was commissioned as a lieutenant and posted aboard the sloop HMS Martin (1761), initially on escort and patrol duty in the English Channel and North Sea. He accompanied the ship when it left Plymouth on 11 February 1782 for the West Indies. On 7 May 1782 he was appointed fourth lieutenant of the 74-gun ship of the line HMS Fame, which was at the time part of the British West Indies Fleet and assigned to patrolling the French-held Leeward Islands. Vancouver subsequently saw action at the Battle of the Saintes (April 1782), wherein he distinguished himself. Vancouver returned to England in June 1783.

=== Nootka Crisis ===
In the late 1780s, the Spanish Empire commissioned an expedition to the Pacific Northwest. In 1789, the Nootka Crisis developed, and Spain and Britain came close to war over ownership of Nootka Sound on contemporary Vancouver Island, and – of greater importance – over the right to colonise and settle the Pacific Northwest coast. Henry Roberts had recently taken command of the survey ship HMS Discovery (a new vessel named in honour of the ship on Cook's voyage) with the prospect of another round-the-world voyage, and Roberts selected Vancouver as his first lieutenant, but they both were then posted to other warships due to the crisis. Vancouver went with Joseph Whidbey to the 74-gun ship of the line HMS Courageux. When the first Nootka Convention ended the crisis in 1790, Vancouver was given command of Discovery to take possession of Nootka Sound and to survey the coasts.

=== Explorations ===
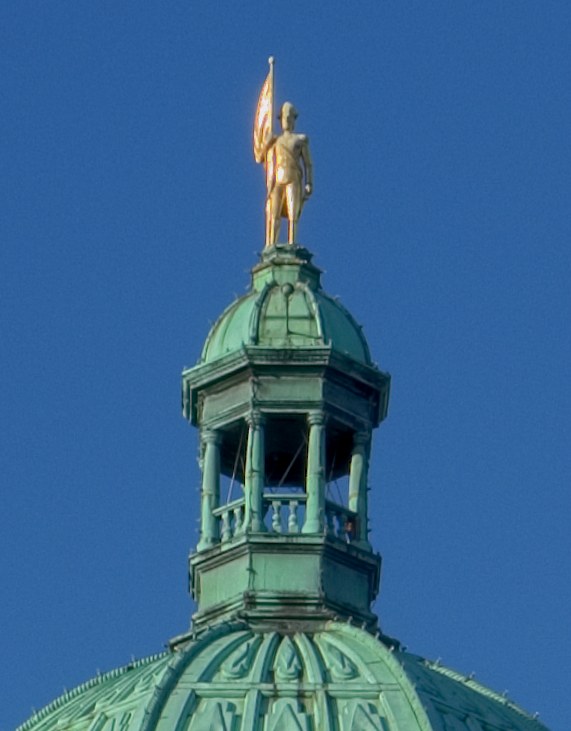
Life-sized gilded statue of George Vancouver on the British Columbia Legislative Buildings in Victoria, British Columbia

==== Vancouver Expedition ====
Departing England with two ships, HMS Discovery and HMS Chatham, on 1 April 1791, Vancouver commanded an expedition charged with exploring the Pacific region. In its first year the expedition travelled to Cape Town, Australia, New Zealand, Tahiti, and Hawaii (then known as the Sandwich Islands), collecting botanical samples and surveying coastlines along the way. He formally claimed at Possession Point, King George Sound Western Australia, which became the town of Albany, Western Australia, for the British. Proceeding to North America, Vancouver followed the coasts of modern-day Oregon and Washington northward. In April 1792 he encountered American Captain Robert Gray off the coast of Oregon just prior to Gray's sailing up the Columbia River.

Vancouver entered the Strait of Juan de Fuca, between Vancouver Island and the modern Washington state mainland, on 29 April 1792. His orders included a survey of every inlet and outlet on the west coast of the mainland, all the way north to Alaska. Most of this work was in small craft propelled by both sail and oar; manoeuvring larger sail-powered vessels in uncharted waters was generally impractical and dangerous.

Vancouver named many features for his officers, friends, associates, and his ship Discovery, including:

- Vancouver Island – after himself (originally co-named Quadra and Vancouver Island)
- Mount Baker – after Discovery's 3rd Lieutenant Joseph Baker, the first on the expedition to spot it
- Mount Rainier – after his friend Rear Admiral Peter Rainier
- Mount St. Helens – after his friend Alleyne FitzHerbert, 1st Baron St Helens
- Burrard Inlet – after his friend Harry Burrard Neale
- Puget Sound – after Discovery's 2nd lieutenant Peter Puget, who explored its southern reaches
- Howe Sound – after Richard Howe, 1st Earl Howe
- Jervis Inlet – after John Jervis, 1st Earl of St Vincent
- Port Gardner and Port Susan, Washington – after his former commander Vice Admiral Sir Alan Gardner and his wife Susannah, Lady Gardner.
- Whidbey Island – after naval engineer Joseph Whidbey.
- Discovery Passage, Discovery Island, Discovery Bay and Port Discovery – after Discovery
- Orford Reef – after Horace Walpole

After a Spanish expedition in 1791, Vancouver was the second European to enter Burrard Inlet on 13 June 1792, naming it for his friend Sir Harry Burrard. It is the modern-day main harbour area of the City of Vancouver beyond Stanley Park. He surveyed Howe Sound and Jervis Inlet over the next nine days. Then, on his 35th birthday on 22 June 1792, he returned to Point Grey, the present-day location of the University of British Columbia. Here he unexpectedly met a Spanish expedition led by Dionisio Alcalá Galiano and Cayetano Valdés y Flores. Vancouver was "mortified" (his word) to learn they already had a crude chart of the Strait of Georgia based on the 1791 exploratory voyage of José María Narváez the year before, under command of Francisco de Eliza. For three weeks they cooperatively explored the Georgia Strait and the Discovery Islands area before sailing separately towards Nootka Sound.

After the summer surveying season ended, in August 1792, Vancouver went to Nootka, then the region's most important harbour, on contemporary Vancouver Island. Here he was to receive any British buildings and lands returned by the Spanish from claims by Francisco de Eliza for the Spanish crown. The Spanish commander, Juan Francisco Bodega y Quadra, was very cordial and he and Vancouver exchanged the maps they had made, but no agreement was reached; they decided to await further instructions. At this time, they decided to name the large island on which Nootka was proven to be located as Quadra and Vancouver Island. Years later, as Spanish influence declined, the name was shortened to simply Vancouver Island.

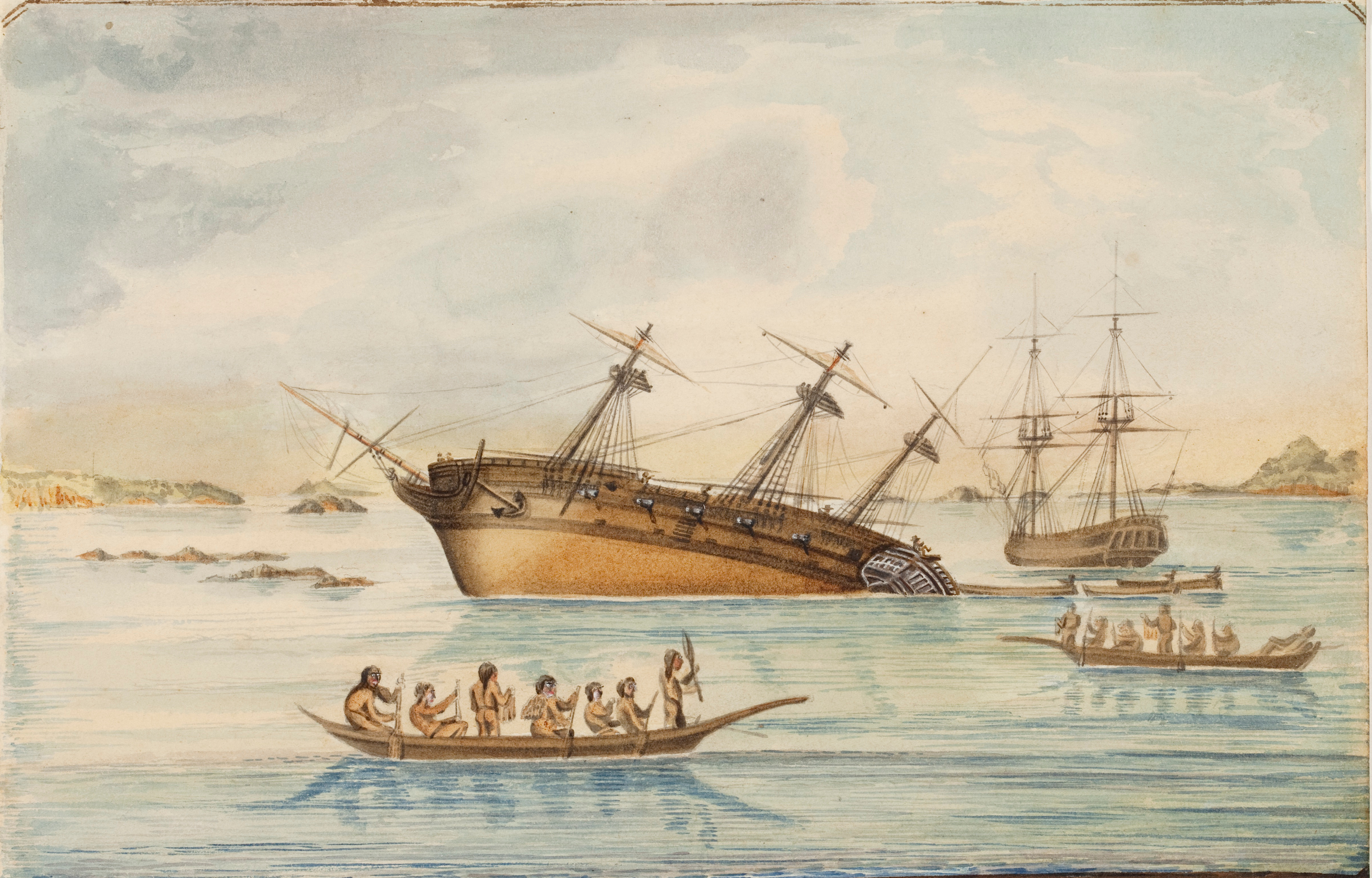
The Discovery ran aground in early August 1792 on hidden rocks in Queen Charlotte Strait in the Pacific Ocean, near Fife Sound.

While at Nootka Sound Vancouver acquired Robert Gray's chart of the lower Columbia River. Gray had entered the river during the summer before sailing to Nootka Sound for repairs. Vancouver realised the importance of verifying Gray's information and conducting a more thorough survey. In October 1792, he sent Lieutenant William Robert Broughton with several boats up the Columbia River. Broughton got as far as the Columbia River Gorge, sighting and naming Mount Hood.

Vancouver sailed south along the coast of Spanish Alta California, entered San Francisco Bay, later visiting Monterey; in both places, he was warmly received by the Spanish. Later he visited Chumash villages at Point Conception and near Mission San Buenaventura. Vancouver spent the winter in continuing exploration of the Sandwich Islands, the contemporary name of the islands of Hawaii.

==== Further explorations ====
The next year, 1793, he returned to British Columbia and proceeded further north, unknowingly missing the overland explorer Alexander Mackenzie by only 48 days. He got to 56°30'N, having explored north from Point Menzies in Burke Channel to the northwest coast of Prince of Wales Island. He sailed around the latter island, as well as circumnavigating Revillagigedo Island and charting parts of the coasts of Mitkof, Zarembo, Etolin, Wrangell, Kuiu and Kupreanof Islands. With worsening weather, he sailed south to Alta California, hoping to find Bodega y Quadra and fulfil his territorial mission, but the Spaniard was not there. The Spanish governor refused to let a foreign official into the interior. Vancouver noted that the region's "only defenses against foreign attack are a few poor cannons". He again spent the winter in the Sandwich Islands.

In 1794, he first went to Cook Inlet, the northernmost point of his exploration, and from there followed the coast south. Boat parties charted the east coasts of Chichagof and Baranof Islands, circumnavigated Admiralty Island, explored to the head of Lynn Canal, and charted the rest of Kuiu Island and nearly all of Kupreanof Island. He then set sail for Great Britain by way of Cape Horn, returning in September 1795, thus completing a circumnavigation of the globe.

== Later life ==
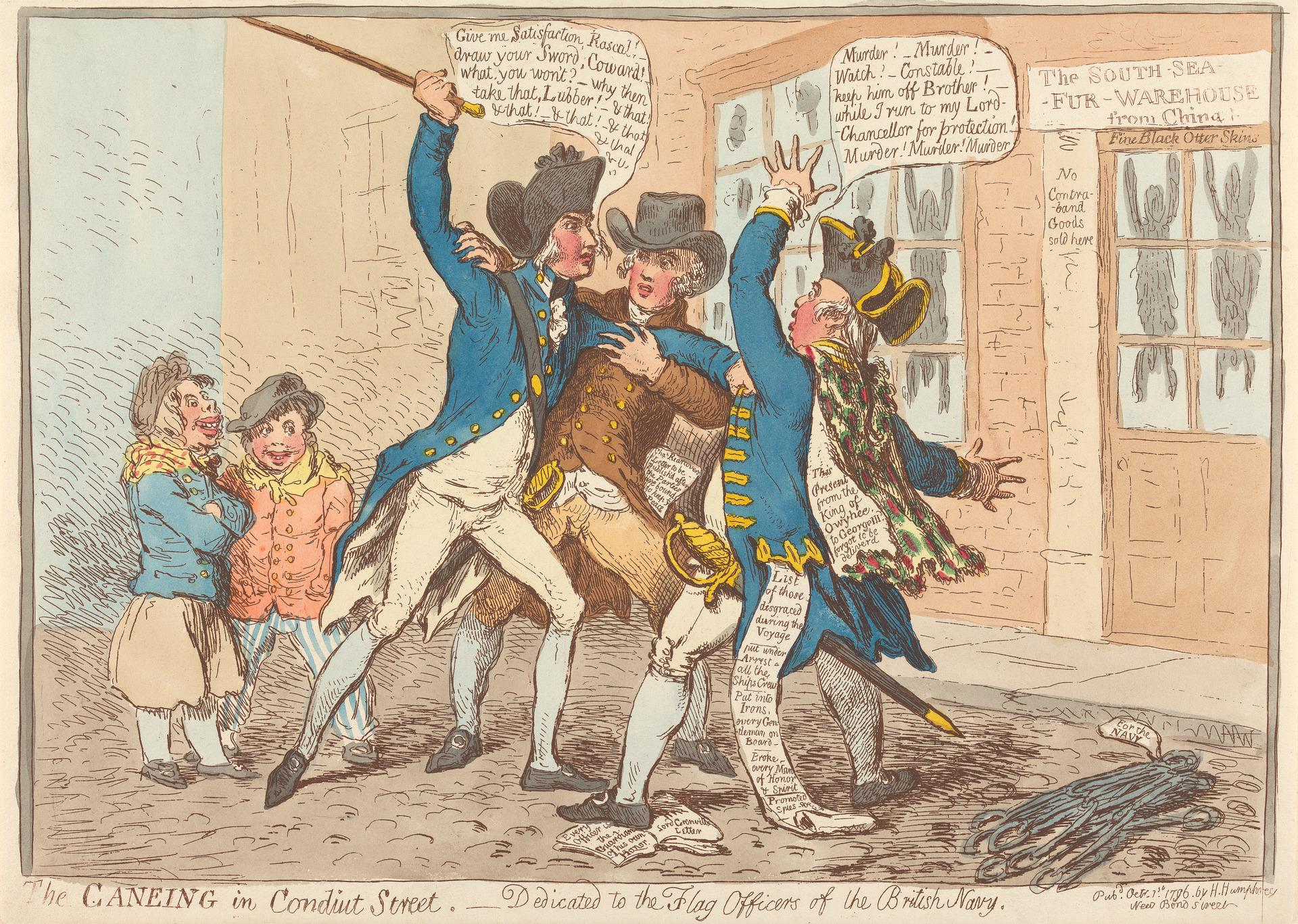
In The Caneing in Conduit Street (1796), James Gillray caricatured Thomas Pitt, 2nd Baron Camelford's street-corner assault on Vancouver in Conduit Street, London.

Impressed by the view from Richmond Hill, Vancouver retired to Petersham, then in Surrey and part of modern London.

Vancouver faced difficulties when he returned home to England. The accomplished and politically well-connected naturalist Archibald Menzies complained that his servant had been pressed into service during a shipboard emergency; sailing master Joseph Whidbey had a competing claim for pay as expedition astronomer; and Thomas Pitt, 2nd Baron Camelford, whom Vancouver had disciplined for numerous infractions and eventually sent home in disgrace, proceeded to harass him publicly and privately.

Pitt's allies, including his cousin, Prime Minister William Pitt the Younger, attacked Vancouver in the press. Thomas Pitt took a more direct approach; on 29 August 1796 he sent Vancouver a letter heaping many insults on the head of his former captain, and challenging him to a duel. Vancouver gravely replied that he was unable "in a private capacity to answer for his public conduct in his official duty", and offered instead to submit to formal examination by flag officers. Pitt chose instead to stalk Vancouver, ultimately assaulting him on a London street corner. The terms of their subsequent legal dispute required both parties to keep the peace, but nothing stopped Vancouver's civilian brother Charles from interposing and giving Pitt blow after blow until onlookers restrained the attacker. Charges and counter-charges flew in the press, with the wealthy Camelford faction having the greater firepower until Vancouver, ailing from his long naval service, died.

== Death ==
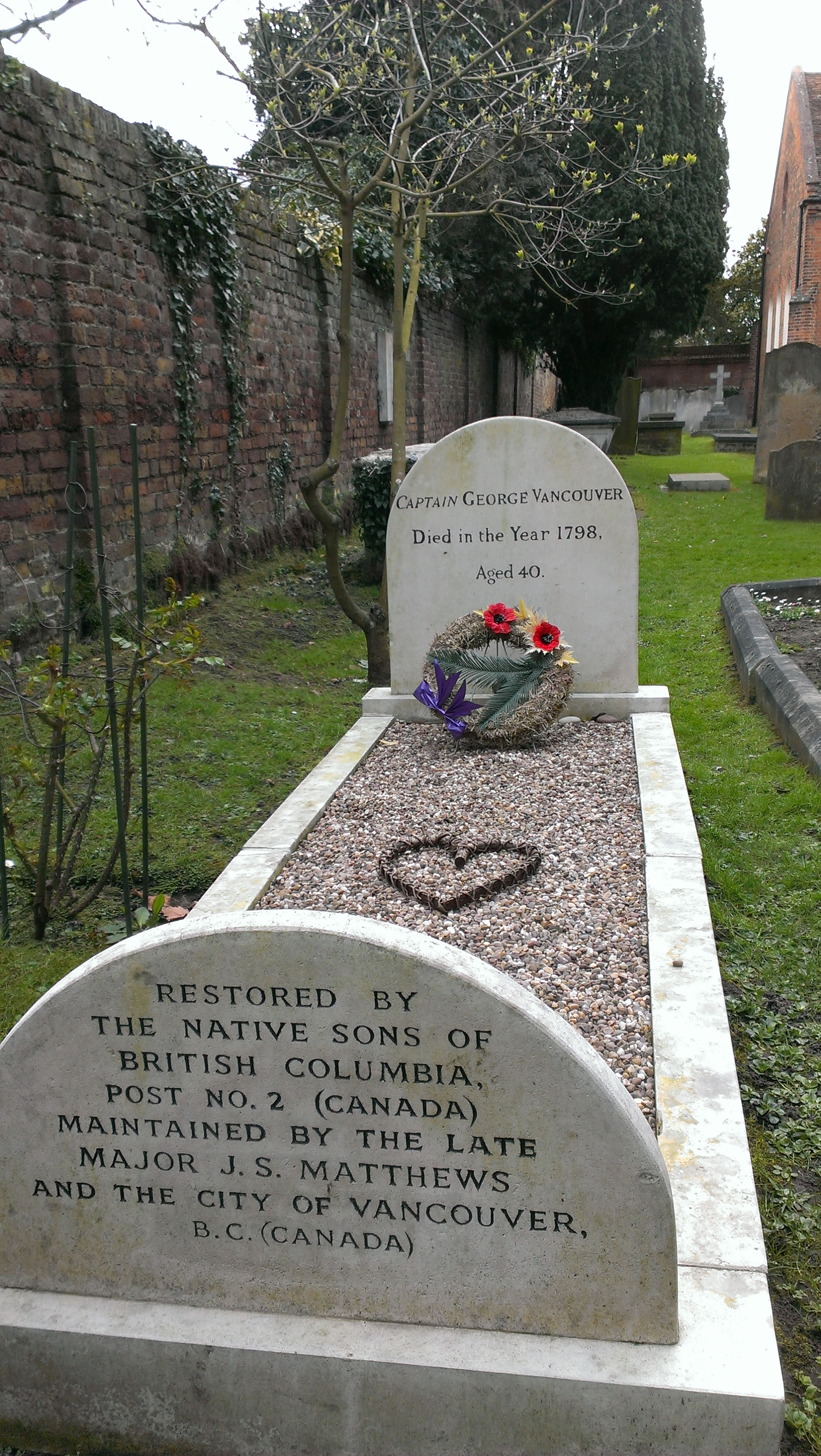
Vancouver's grave in St Peter’s Church, Petersham

Vancouver, at one time amongst Britain's greatest explorers and navigators, died in obscurity on 10 May 1798 at the age of 40, less than three years after completing his voyages and expeditions. No official cause of death was stated, as the medical records pertaining to Vancouver were destroyed; one doctor named John Naish claimed Vancouver died from kidney failure, while others believed it was a hyperthyroid condition.

Vancouver's grave is in the churchyard of St Peter's Church, Petersham, in the London Borough of Richmond upon Thames, England. The Hudson's Bay Company placed a memorial plaque in the church in 1841. His grave in Portland stone, renovated in the 1960s, is now Grade II listed in view of its historical associations.

== Legacy ==
=== Navigation ===
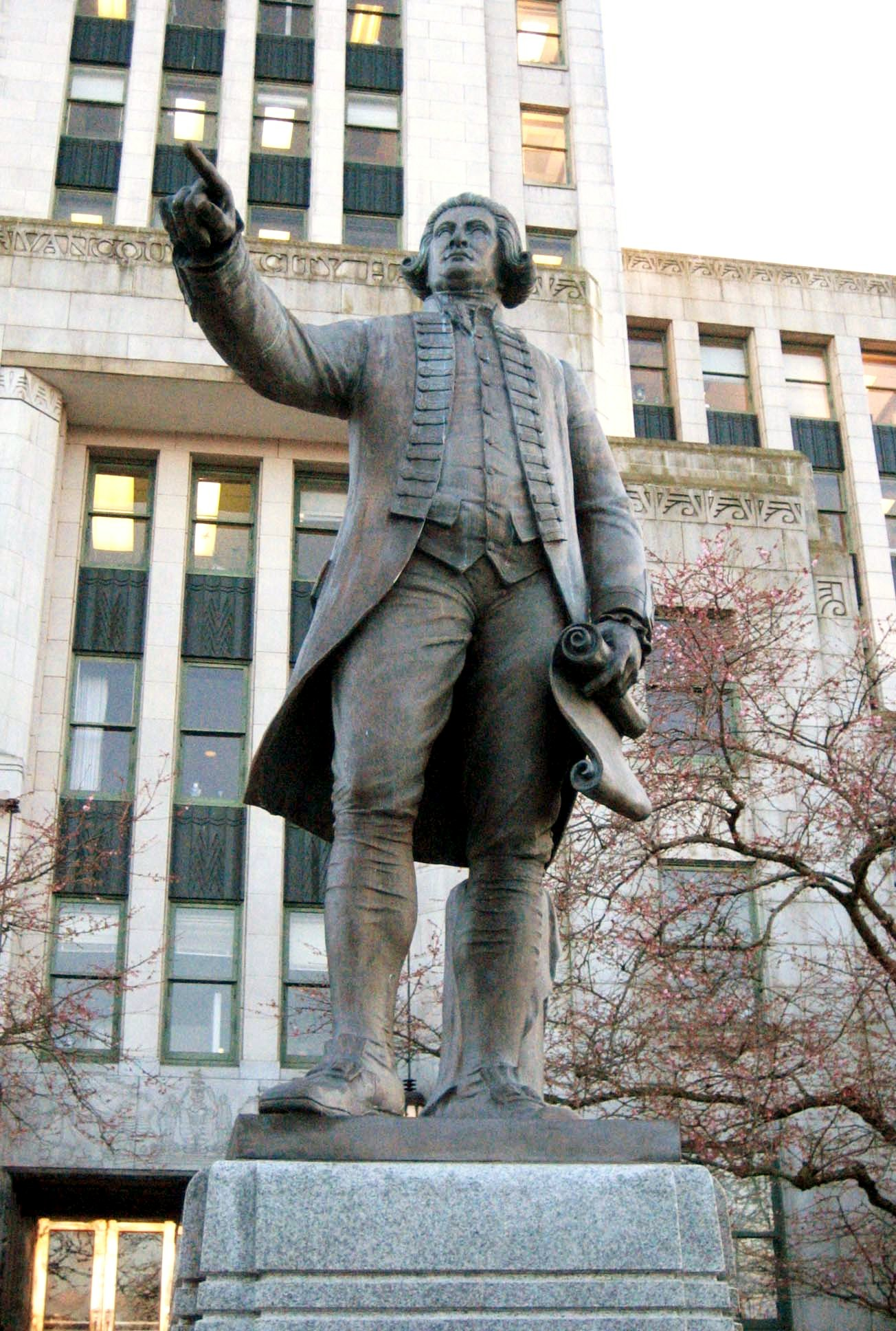
A statue of George Vancouver in front of Vancouver City Hall

Vancouver determined that the Northwest Passage did not exist at the latitudes that had long been suggested. His charts of the North American northwest coast were so extremely accurate that they served as the key reference for coastal navigation for generations. Robin Fisher, the academic vice-president of Mount Royal University in Calgary and author of two books on Vancouver, states:

He put the northwest coast on the map...He drew up a map of the north-west coast that was accurate to the 9th degree, to the point it was still being used into the modern day as a navigational aid. That's unusual for a map from that early a time.

However, Vancouver failed to discover two of the largest and most important rivers on the Pacific coast, the Fraser River and the Columbia River. He also missed the Skeena River near Prince Rupert in northern British Columbia. Vancouver did eventually learn of the Columbia River before he finished his survey—from Robert Gray, captain of the American merchant ship that conducted the first Euroamerican sailing of the Columbia River on 11 May 1792, after first sighting it on an earlier voyage in 1788. However, neither the Columbia River nor the Fraser River were included on any of Vancouver's charts.

Stephen R. Bown noted in Mercator's World magazine's November/December 1999 issue that:

How Vancouver could have missed these rivers while accurately charting hundreds of comparatively insignificant inlets, islands, and streams is hard to fathom. What is certain is that his failure to spot the Columbia had great implications for the future political development of the Pacific Northwest....

While it is difficult to comprehend how Vancouver missed the Fraser River, much of this river's delta was subject to flooding and summer freshet which prevented the captain from spotting any of its great channels as he sailed the entire shoreline from Point Roberts, Washington, to Point Grey in 1792. The Spanish expeditions to the Pacific Northwest, with the 1791 Francisco de Eliza expedition preceding Vancouver by a year, had also missed the Fraser River although they knew from its muddy plume that there was a major river located nearby.

=== Indigenous peoples ===
Vancouver generally established a rapport with both Indigenous peoples and European trappers. Historical records show that Vancouver enjoyed good relations with native leaders—in Hawaii with King Kamehameha I, as well as in the Pacific Northwest and California. Vancouver's journals exhibit a high degree of sensitivity to the indigenous populations he encountered. He wrote of meeting the Chumash people, and of his exploration of a small island on the Californian coast on which an important burial site was marked by a sepulchre of "peculiar character" lined with boards and fragments of military instruments lying near a square box covered with mats. Vancouver states:

This we naturally conjectured contained the remains of some person of consequence, and it much excited the curiosity of some of our party; but as further examination could not possibly have served any useful purpose, and might have given umbrage and pain to the friends of the deceased, should it be their custom to visit the repositories of their dead, I did not think it right that it should be disturbed.

Vancouver also displayed contempt in his journals towards unscrupulous western traders who provided guns to natives, writing:

I am extremely concerned to be compelled to state here, that many of the traders from the civilised world have not only pursued a line of conduct, diametrically opposite to the true principles of justice in their commercial dealings, but have fomented discords, and stirred up contentions, between the different tribes, in order to increase the demand for these destructive engines... They have been likewise eager to instruct the natives in the use of European arms of all descriptions; and have shewn by their own example, that they consider gain as the only object of pursuit; and whether this be acquired by fair and honourable means, or otherwise, so long as the advantage is secured, the manner how it is obtained seems to have been, with too many of them, but a very secondary consideration.

Robin Fisher notes that Vancouver's "relationships with aboriginal groups were generally peaceful; indeed, his detailed survey would not have been possible if they had been hostile." While there were hostile incidents at the end of Vancouver's last season—the most serious of which involved a clash with the Tlingit people at Behm Canal in southeast Alaska in 1794—these were the exceptions in Vancouver's exploration of the US and Canadian Northwest coast.

Despite a long history of warfare between Britain and Spain, Vancouver maintained excellent relations with his Spanish counterparts and even fêted a Spanish sea captain aboard his ship Discovery during his 1792 trip to the Vancouver region.

=== Namesakes ===
==== Ship and cadet units ====
- HMCS Vancouver Halifax-class frigate of the Royal Canadian Navy (Named for the city, which is named for the man.)
- TS Vancouver, Australian Navy Cadets
- 47 RCSCC CAPTAIN VANCOUVER, Royal Canadian Sea Cadets

==== Places ====
Many places around the world have been named after George Vancouver, including:

===== Australia =====
- Vancouver Peninsula, Cape Vancouver and Vancouver Breakers in King George Sound, Western Australia

===== Canada =====
- Mount Vancouver, in Yukon and neighbouring Alaska, eighth highest mountain in Canada
- Vancouver, British Columbia, a major city on the mainland in southwestern British Columbia, the province's largest city
  - Vancouver Maritime Museum
- Vancouver Bay, British Columbia, in Jervis Inlet, East of Powell River, named after Vancouver when Capt. George H. Richards resurveyed the area in 1860.
- Vancouver Island, in British Columbia off the southwest coast of the mainland. North America's largest Pacific Island and location of the provincial capital at Victoria on its southern tip.
- Vancouver River, a river flowing into the Jervis Inlet on the Sunshine Coast of British Columbia.

===== New Zealand =====
- Mount Vancouver, the sixth highest mountain in New Zealand.
- Vancouver Arm of Breaksea Sound, Fiordland, South Island

===== United Kingdom =====
- Vancouver Road in Ham, London, near Petersham, his place of burial

===== United States =====
- Vancouver, Washington, a city in southwest Washington across the Columbia River from Portland, Oregon
  - Fort Vancouver, a Hudson's Bay Company trading post established in 1825

==== Memorials ====
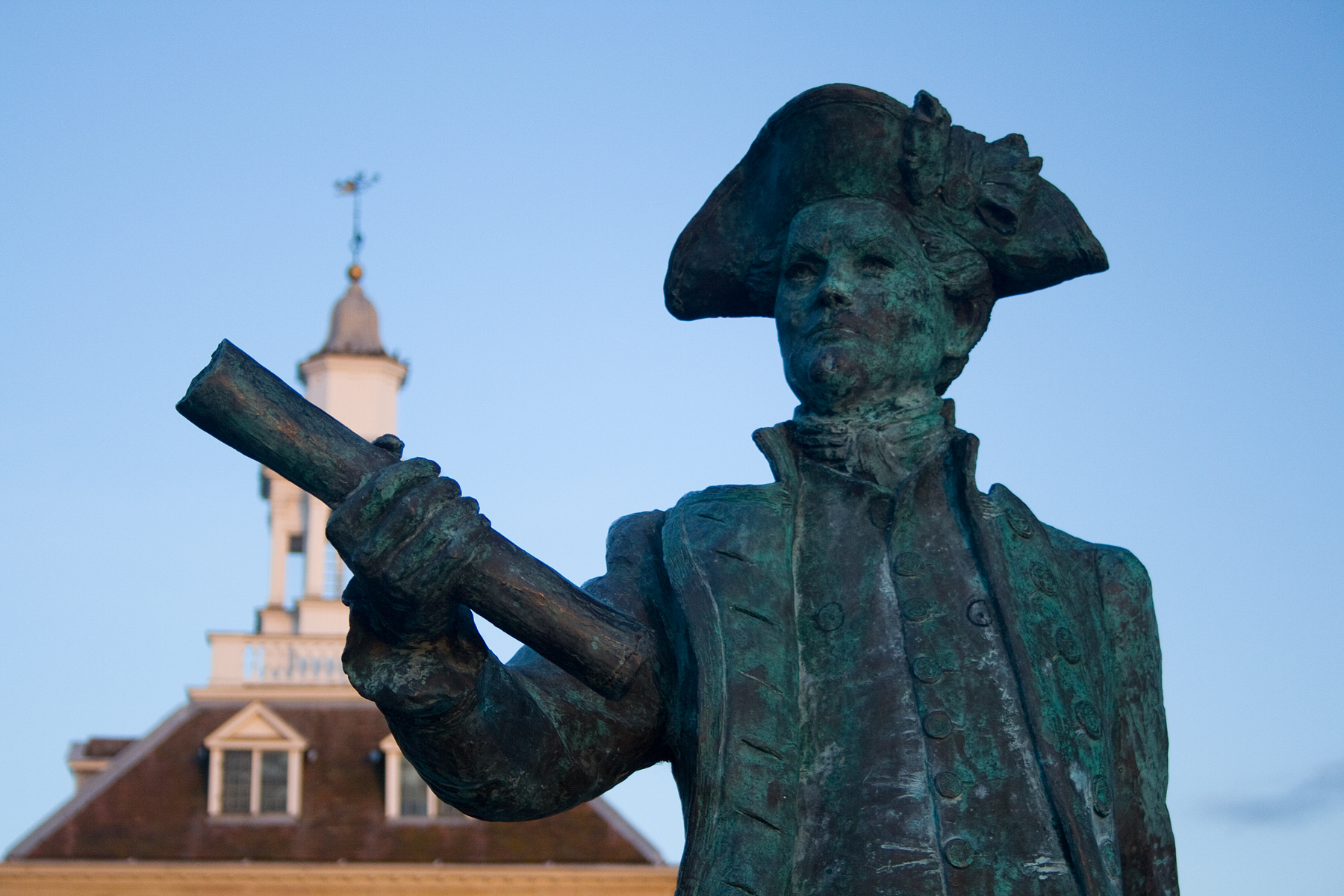
Statue of George Vancouver in King's Lynn, his birthplace in England

- Statues of Vancouver are located in his birthplace of King's Lynn, in front of Vancouver City Hall, and on top of the dome of the British Columbia Parliament Buildings.
- The Vancouver Quarter Shopping Centre bears his name in King's Lynn.
- Canada Post issued a pair of 14-cent stamps to mark the 200th anniversary of Captain Cook's arrival at Nootka Sound on Vancouver Island on 26 April 1978. George Vancouver was a crewman on this voyage.
- Gate to the Northwest Passage, a commemorative statue by Vancouver artist Alan Chung Hung was commissioned by Parks Canada and installed at the mouth of False Creek in Vanier Park near the Vancouver Maritime Museum in 1980.
- Canada Post issued a 37-cent stamp inscribed Vancouver Explores the Coast on 17 March 1988. It was one of a set of four stamps issued to honour Exploration of Canada – Recognizers.
- The George Vancouver Rose, named in his honour and hybridised by Agriculture and Agri-Food Canada.
- First Capital Connect named Class 365 unit 365514 Captain George Vancouver, operating on the route between King's Lynn and London.
- Virgin CrossCountry named Class 221 unit 221129 George Vancouver in 2003, it was denamed on transfer to Arriva CrossCountry in 2007.
- A commemorative monument is located on the beach in North Kihei, Maui, Hawaii, commemorating George Vancouver's contribution of coffee and root vegetables to the islands of Hawaii, inscribed by Pierre Elliot Trudeau 2 December 1967.
- Statue of George Vancouver (2000), Vancouver, Washington

Many collections were made on the voyage: one was donated by Archibald Menzies to the British Museum 1796; another made by surgeon George Goodman Hewett (1765–1834) was donated by Augustus Wollaston Franks to the British Museum in 1891. An account of these has been published.

=== 250th birthday commemorations ===
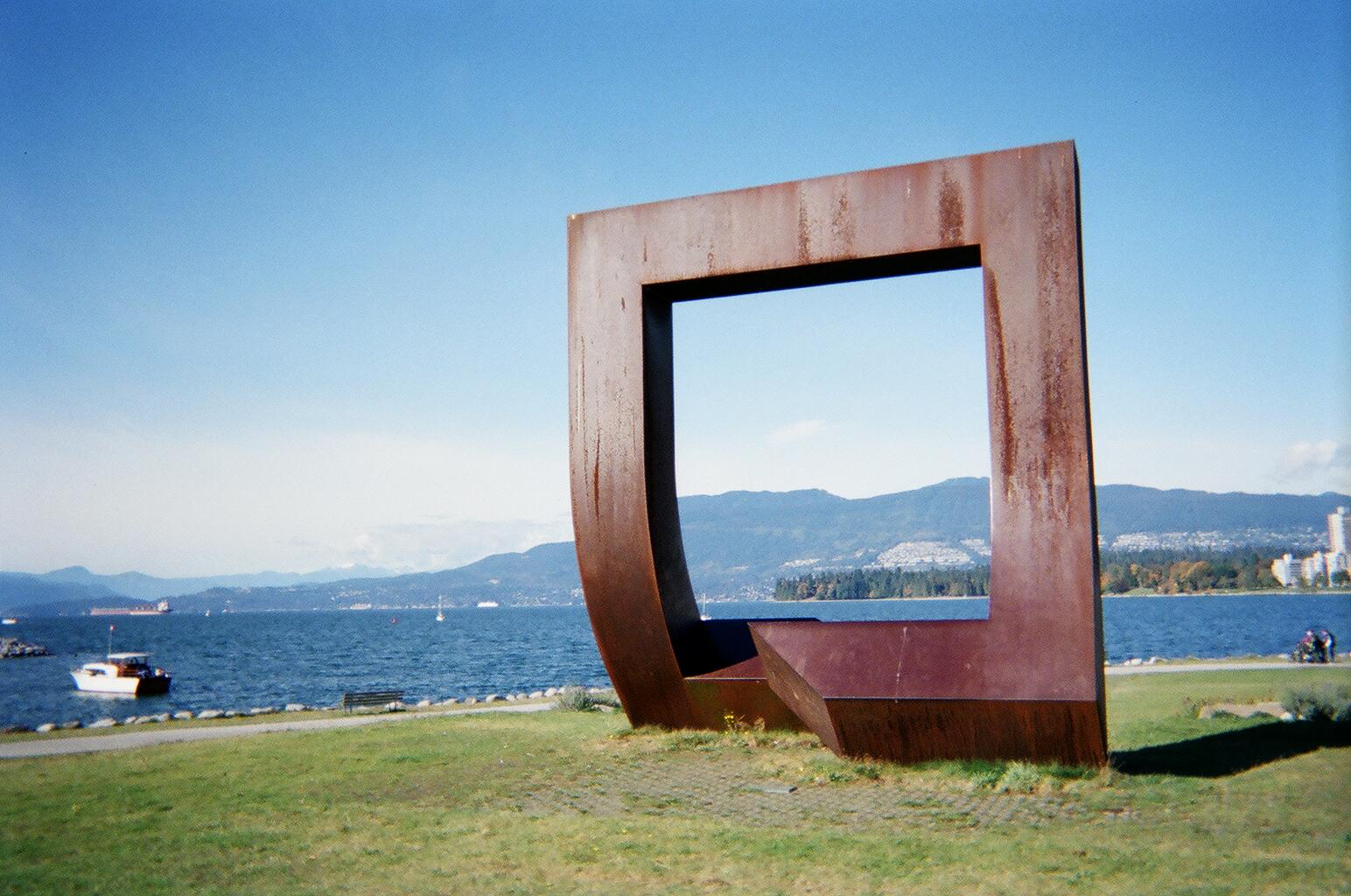
Gate to the Northwest Passage (1980) by Vancouver artist Alan Chung Hung, commemorating the entrance of Captain Vancouver into Burrard Inlet.

Canada Post issued a $1.55 postage stamp to commemorate the 250th anniversary of Vancouver's birth, on 22 June 2007. The stamp has an embossed image of Vancouver seen from behind as he gazes forward towards a mountainous coastline. This may be the first Canadian stamp not to show the subject's face.

The City of Vancouver in Canada organised a celebration to commemorate the 250th anniversary of Vancouver's birth, in June 2007 at the Vancouver Maritime Museum. The one-hour festivities included the presentation of a massive 63 by 114 centimetre carrot cake, the firing of a gun salute by the Royal Canadian Artillery's 15th Field Regiment and a performance by the Vancouver Firefighter's Band. Vancouver's then-mayor, Sam Sullivan, officially declared 22 June 2007 to be "George Day".

The Musqueam (xʷməθkʷəy̓əm) Elder sɁəyeɬəq (Larry Grant) attended the festivities and acknowledged that some of his people might disapprove of his presence, but also noted:

Many people don't feel aboriginal people should be celebrating this occasion...I believe it has helped the world and that's part of who we are. That's the legacy of our people. We're generous to a fault. The legacy is strong and a good one, in the sense that without the first nations working with the colonials, it [B.C.] wouldn't have been part of Canada to begin with and Britain would be the poorer for it.

== Origins of the family name ==
There has been some debate about the origins of the Vancouver name. It is now commonly accepted that the name Vancouver derives from the expression van Coevorden, meaning "(originating) from Coevorden", a city in the northeast of the Netherlands. This city is apparently named after the "Coeverden" family of the 13th–15th century.

In the 16th century, a number of businessmen from the Coevorden area (and the rest of the Netherlands) moved to England. Some of them were known as Van Coeverden. Others adopted the surname Oxford, as in oxen fording (a river), which is approximately the English translation of Coevorden. However, it is not the exact name of the noble family mentioned in the history books that claim Vancouver's noble lineage: that name was Coeverden not Coevorden.

In the 1970s, Adrien Mansvelt, a former consul-general of the Netherlands based in Vancouver, published a collation of information in both historical and genealogical journals and in the Vancouver Sun newspaper. Mansvelt's theory was later presented by the city during the Expo 86 World's Fair, as historical fact. The information was then used by historian W. Kaye Lamb in his book A Voyage of Discovery to the North Pacific Ocean and Round the World, 1791–1795 (1984).

W. Kaye Lamb, in summarising Mansvelt's 1973 research, observes evidence of close family ties between the Vancouver family of Britain and the Van Coeverden family of the Netherlands as well as George Vancouver's own words from his diaries in referring to his Dutch ancestry:

As the name Vancouver suggests, the Vancouvers were of Dutch origin. They were descended from the titled van Coeverden family, one of the oldest in the Netherlands. By the twelfth century, and for many years thereafter, their castle at Coevorden, in the Province of Drenthe, was an important fortress on the eastern frontier. George Vancouver was aware of this. In July 1794, he named the Lynn Canal "after the place of my nativity" and Point Couverden (which he spelt incorrectly) "after the seat of my ancestors". Vancouver's great grandfather, Reint Wolter van Couverden, was probably the first of the line to establish an English connection. While serving as a squire at one of the German courts he met Johanna (Jane) Lilingston, an English girl who was one of the ladies in waiting. They were married in 1699. Their son, Lucas Hendrik van Couverden, married Vancouver's grandmother, Sarah. In his later years he probably anglicized his name and spent most of his time in England. By the eighteenth century, the estates of the van Couverdens were mostly in the Province of Overijssel, and some of the family were living in Vollenhove, on the Zuider Zee. The English and Dutch branches kept in touch, and in 1798 (the date of Vancouver's death) George Vancouver's brother Charles would marry a kinswoman, Louise Josephine van Couverden, of Vollenhove. Both were great-grandchildren of Reint Wolter van Couverden."

In 2006 John Robson, a librarian at the University of Waikato, conducted his own research into George Vancouver's ancestry, which he published in an article in the British Columbia History journal. Robson theorises that Vancouver's forebears may have been Flemish rather than Dutch; he believes that Vancouver is descended from the Vangover family of Ipswich in Suffolk and Colchester in Essex. Those towns had a significant Flemish population in the 16th and 17th centuries.

George Vancouver named the south point of what is now Couverden Island, Alaska, Point Couverden during his exploration of the North American Pacific coast, in honour of his family's hometown of Coevorden. It is located at the western point of entry to Lynn Canal in southeastern Alaska.

== Works by George Vancouver ==
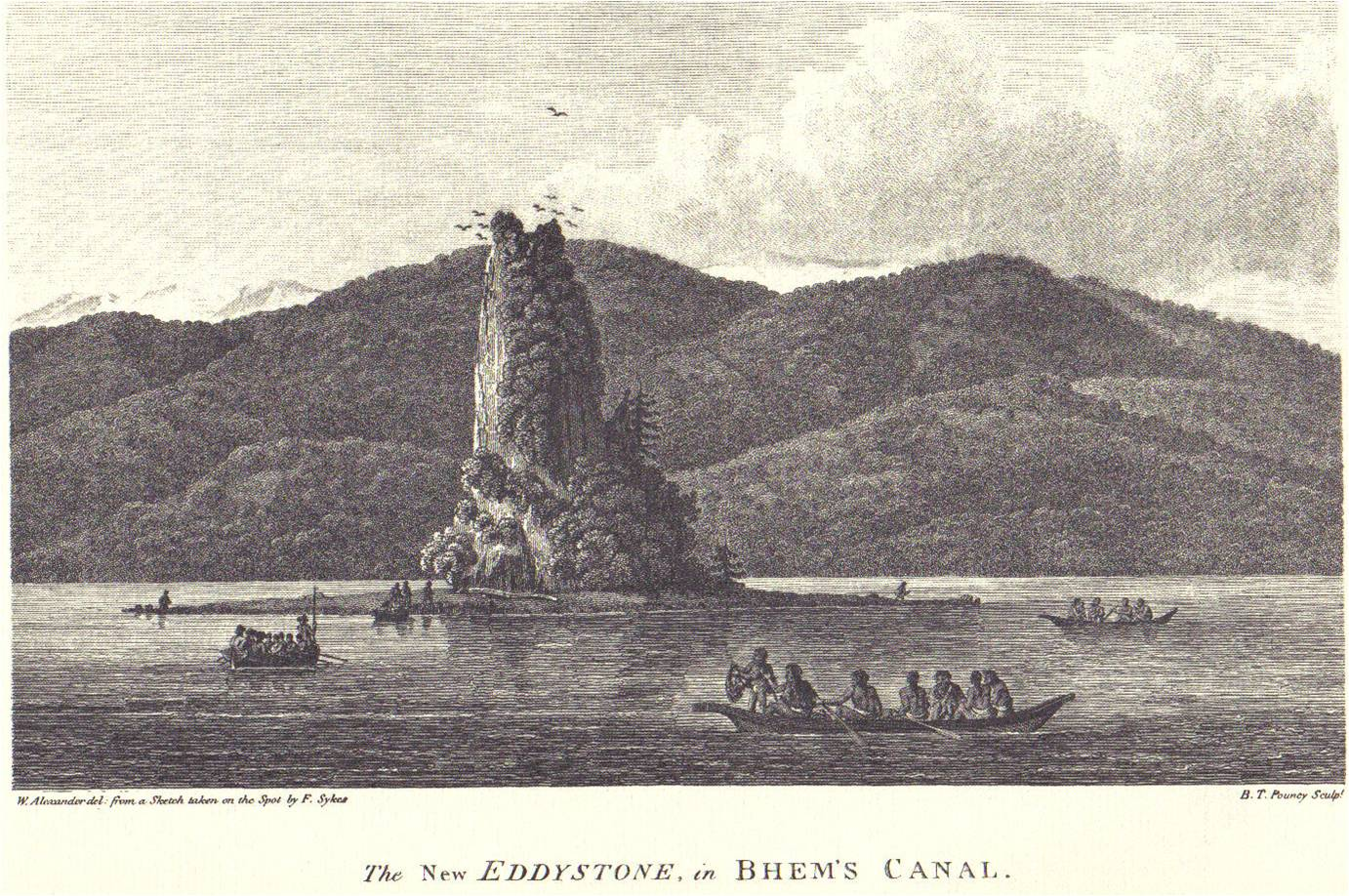
1798 engraving of New Eddystone Rock in Alaska, in George Vancouver's report to King George III. It is made of basalt.

The Admiralty instructed Vancouver to publish a narrative of his voyage which he started to write in early 1796 in Petersham. At the time of his death the manuscript covered the period up to mid-1795. The work, A Voyage of Discovery to the North Pacific Ocean, and Round the World, was completed by his brother John and published in three volumes in the autumn of 1798. A second edition was published in 1801 in six volumes.

- A Voyage of Discovery to the North Pacific Ocean: And Round the World, Volume 1
- A Voyage of Discovery to the North Pacific Ocean: And Round the World, Volume 2
- A Voyage of Discovery to the North Pacific Ocean: And Round the World, Volume 3

A modern annotated edition (1984) by W. Kaye Lamb was renamed The Voyage of George Vancouver 1791–1795, and published in four volumes by the Hakluyt Society of London, England.

== See also ==
- European and American voyages of scientific exploration
