= Behm Canal =

Natural channel in the Alexander Archipelago

- Location of Behm Canal in Alaska
- Location: Alexander Archipelago
- Country: USA
- Coordinates: 55°56′13″N 131°11′18″W

Behm Canal is a natural channel in the Alexander Archipelago, in the southeastern part of the U.S. state of Alaska.

About 108 miles (174 km) long, Behm Canal separates Revillagigedo Island from the mainland. From the Clarence Strait, Behm Canal extends north and northeast, through the Behm Narrows and by the mouth of the Unuk River, then south to Revillagigedo Channel.

The Behm Canal was charted and named by George Vancouver in 1793, in honor of Magnus von Behm, who was the governor of Kamchatka in 1779 when Captain James Cook's ships, with Vancouver among the crew, arrived at Petropavlovsk shortly after Cook was killed in Hawaii. It was Behm who carried the news of Cook's death to Europe.

The canal is used by the Southeast Alaska Acoustic Measurement Facility (SEAFAC) as an acoustic testing site for United States Navy submarines.

New Eddystone Rock is a craggy, much-photographed basalt island in Behm Canal.
