= Ketchikan Gateway Borough, Alaska =

Borough in Alaska, United States

- Borough
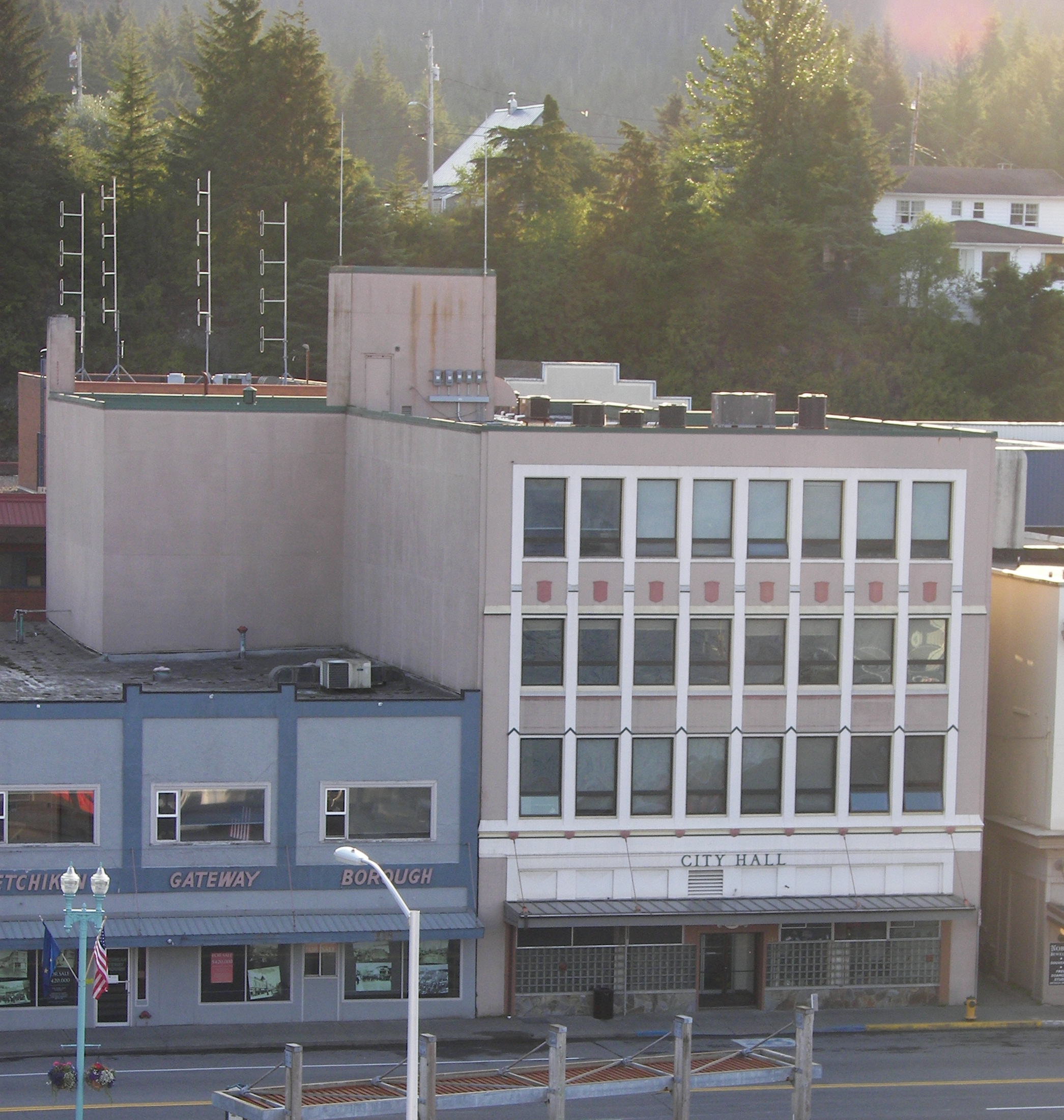
- City (left) and former borough governments

- Seal Logo

- Location within the U.S. state of Alaska
- Coordinates: 55°33′00″N 131°05′00″W
- Country: United States
- State: Alaska
- Incorporated: September 6, 1963
- Seat: Ketchikan
- Largest city: Ketchikan

Area
  - Total: 6,654 sq mi (17,230 km^{2})
  - Land: 4,858 sq mi (12,580 km^{2})
  - Water: 1,795 sq mi (4,650 km^{2}) 27.0%

Population (2020)
  - Total: 13,948
  - Estimate (2025): 13,549 ▼
  - Density: 2.871/sq mi (1.109/km^{2})
- Time zone: UTC−9 (Alaska)
  - Summer (DST): UTC−8 (ADT)
- Congressional district: At-large
- Website: www.kgbak.us

Ketchikan Gateway Borough is a borough located in the U.S. state of Alaska. As of the 2020 census its population was 13,948, up from 13,477 in 2010. The borough seat is Ketchikan. The borough is the second most populous borough in Southeast Alaska, second to Juneau Borough.

Ketchikan Gateway Borough comprises the Ketchikan, AK Micropolitan Statistical Area.

== Geography ==
The borough has a total area of 6,654 square miles (17,230 km^{2}), of which 4,858 square miles (12,580 km^{2}) is land and 1,795 square miles (4,650 km^{2}) (27.0%) is water. On May 19, 2008, a large part of the former Prince of Wales–Outer Ketchikan Census Area was annexed, including the remainder of Misty Fjords National Monument that was not already in the borough, making the current figures much larger than these. A map of the current area can be seen here:

=== Adjacent boroughs and census areas ===
- Prince of Wales–Hyder Census Area, AK – east, west
- City and Borough of Wrangell, AK – north
- Kitimat–Stikine Regional District, BC – east
- Skeena–Queen Charlotte Regional District, BC – south

=== National protected areas ===
- Tongass National Forest – partly
  - Misty Fjords National Monument
    - Misty Fjords National Monument Wilderness

== Demographics ==
Historical population
Census	Pop.	Note	%±
1960	10,070		—
1970	10,041		−0.3%
1980	11,316		12.7%
1990	13,828		22.2%
2000	14,070		1.8%
2010	13,477		−4.2%
2020	13,948		3.5%
2025 (est.)	13,549	▼	−2.9%
U.S. Decennial Census; 1790–1960 1900–1990; 1990–2000 2010–2020

=== 2020 census ===
Ketchikan Gateway Borough, Alaska – Racial and ethnic composition Note: the US Census treats Hispanic/Latino as an ethnic category. This table excludes Latinos from the racial categories and assigns them to a separate category. Hispanics/Latinos may be of any race.
Race / Ethnicity (NH = Non-Hispanic)	Pop 2000	Pop 2010	Pop 2020	% 2000	% 2010	% 2020
White alone (NH)	10,264	8,918	8,221	72.95%	66.17%	58.94%
Black or African American alone (NH)	67	76	100	0.48%	0.56%	0.72%
Native American or Alaska Native alone (NH)	2,049	1,831	2,264	14.56%	13.59%	16.23%
Asian alone (NH)	596	936	1,118	4.24%	6.95%	8.02%
Native Hawaiian or Pacific Islander alone (NH)	19	24	26	0.14%	0.18%	0.19%
Other race alone (NH)	11	14	93	0.08%	0.10%	0.67%
Mixed race or Multiracial (NH)	692	1,140	1,476	4.92%	8.46%	10.58%
Hispanic or Latino (any race)	372	538	650	2.64%	3.99%	4.66%
Total	14,070	13,477	13,948	100.00%	100.00%	100.00%

As of the 2020 census, the borough had a population of 13,948 and a median age of 39.9 years. 22.2% of residents were under the age of 18 and 16.2% were 65 years of age or older. For every 100 females there were 103.2 males, and for every 100 females age 18 and over there were 102.4 males age 18 and over.

The racial makeup of the borough was 60.4% White, 0.7% Black or African American, 16.7% American Indian and Alaska Native, 8.1% Asian, 0.2% Native Hawaiian and Pacific Islander, 1.6% from some other race, and 12.2% from two or more races. Hispanic or Latino residents of any race comprised 4.7% of the population.

85.9% of residents lived in urban areas, while 14.1% lived in rural areas.

There were 5,479 households in the borough, of which 31.0% had children under the age of 18 living with them and 24.3% had a female householder with no spouse or partner present. About 28.9% of all households were made up of individuals and 10.8% had someone living alone who was 65 years of age or older.

There were 6,614 housing units, of which 17.2% were vacant. Among occupied housing units, 59.4% were owner-occupied and 40.6% were renter-occupied. The homeowner vacancy rate was 1.7% and the rental vacancy rate was 13.3%.

=== 2010 census ===
As of the census of 2010, there were 13,477 people, 5,305 households, and 3,369 families residing in the borough. The population density was 11 people per square mile (4.2 people/km^{2}). There were 6,166 housing units at an average density of 5 per square mile (1.9/km^{2}). The racial makeup of the borough was 68.7% White, 0.7% Black or African American, 14.3% Native American, 7.1% Asian (5.8% Filipino, 0.3% Chinese, 0.2% Japanese), 0.2% Pacific Islander (0.1% Hawaiian), 0.7% from other races, and 8.3% from two or more races. 4.3% of the population were Hispanic or Latino of any race. 3.31% reported speaking Tagalog at home, while 1.65% speak Spanish.

The median income for a household in the city was $61,695, and the median income for a family was $45,417. Males had a median income of $35,139 versus $37,500 for females. The per capita income for the city was $29,520. About 8.3% of the population were below the poverty line.

=== 2000 census ===
The 2000 census recorded 5,399 households, of which 36.80% had children under the age of 18 living with them, 51.50% were married couples living together, 11.30% had a female householder with no husband present, and 32.70% were non-families. 26.10% of all households were made up of individuals, and 6.20% had someone living alone who was 65 years of age or older. The average household size was 2.56, and the average family size was 3.10.

The 2000 census reported the population was spread out, with 28.20% under the age of 18, 7.50% from 18 to 24, 31.40% from 25 to 44, 25.10% from 45 to 64, and 7.90% who were 65 years of age or older. The median age was 36 years. For every 100 females, there were 104.50 males. For every 100 females age 18 and over, there were 105.30 males.

== Communities ==
=== Cities ===
- Ketchikan (Borough seat)
- Saxman

=== Census-designated place ===
- Loring

=== Unincorporated communities ===
- Ward Cove
- Clover Pass

=== Census Subareas ===
- Ketchikan Gateway

== Government and politics ==
United States presidential election results for Ketchikan Gateway Borough, Alaska
Year	Republican		Democratic		Third party(ies)	
Year	No.	%	No.	%	No.	%
1960	1,911	52.50%	1,729	47.50%	0	0.00%
1964	1,365	37.49%	2,276	62.51%	0	0.00%
1968	1,765	49.59%	1,342	37.71%	452	12.70%
1972	2,263	58.40%	1,364	35.20%	248	6.40%
1976	2,439	62.22%	1,324	33.78%	157	4.01%
1980	2,824	58.61%	1,323	27.46%	671	13.93%
1984	3,509	61.79%	2,033	35.80%	137	2.41%
1988	2,994	56.18%	2,216	41.58%	119	2.23%
1992	2,468	37.25%	2,052	30.97%	2,106	31.78%
1996	4,178	65.97%	1,474	23.27%	681	10.75%
2000	4,679	72.69%	1,285	19.96%	473	7.35%
2004	3,170	68.96%	1,343	29.21%	84	1.83%
2008	3,833	58.81%	2,490	38.20%	195	2.99%
2012	3,266	62.42%	1,754	33.52%	212	4.05%
2016	3,492	58.43%	1,990	33.30%	494	8.27%
2020	3,985	58.79%	2,467	36.40%	326	4.81%
2024	3,738	57.50%	2,496	38.39%	267	4.11%

Ketchikan Gateway Borough is strongly conservative, and has voted Republican all but once since statehood in 1959. Ketchikan Gateway Borough has mirrored Alaska’s choice for the statewide presidential winner in every election since 1960.

== See also ==
- Ketchikan Gateway Borough School District
- List of airports in the Ketchikan Gateway Borough
- National Register of Historic Places listings in Ketchikan Gateway Borough, Alaska
