= Conservation and restoration of totem poles =

Preservation of heritage collections

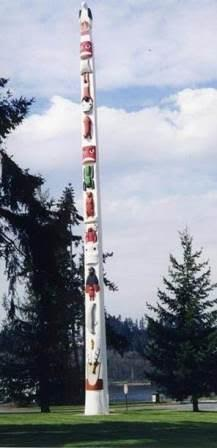
Totem pole carved by William Shelton in Olympia, Washington

The conservation and restoration of totem poles is a relatively new topic in the field of art conservation. Those who are custodians of totem poles include Native American communities, museums, cultural heritage centers, parks or national parks, camp grounds or those that belong to individuals. Conservation activities include the historical research and context of totem poles, studying materials and manufacture, performing assessments, documentation and treatments. This field can pertain to conservator-restorers, Native Americans, curators, collection managers, registrars, park rangers and city planners.

== History ==
In the field of Conservation of Cultural Heritage, the totem pole is categorized as a wooden object. Although totem poles are generally identified as wooden objects, there are more complex ideologies associated with them. Totem poles "are more than works of art; they embody the culture of the Native peoples of the Pacific Northwest". Today, conservators must regard the communities from which the poles originated prior to performing any type of assessment or conservation treatment. Totem poles can pose ethical issues in the practice of conservation. These issues may be; spiritual or ceremonial that concern their original communities, or related to provenance. "In recent years more attention has been focused on understanding the perspective of the Native American culture in regards to totem poles, especially by conservators. Instead of approaching the conservation of a totem pole with mere intellect some have turned to understanding the spiritual and ceremonial significance".

"In anthropological terms, totem poles are visible proof of family lineages". The Totem Pole began being collected by many anthropologists and museums in the late 1800s and early 1900s, thus removing them from their original contexts. Many totem poles originate from Alaska and Canada. Over the last decade, the care and conservation of poles has been a newly developing subject as many museums around the world now hold poles within their collections. In order for conservators to understand the care needed for poles, they must study the methods by which they have been created.

== Materials used for manufacture ==
Totem poles are made from Western Red Cedar and are made from one large cedar log. Poles are carved by hand, using tools such as an axe, chisels, gouges and adzes. Poles can take anywhere between 6 months up to a year to complete. The time to complete a pole can depend on the size of the pole, the amount of time spent and the experience of the carver. Totem poles can either be painted or unpainted. If painted, paints can either be manufactured or made from mineral pigments. The traditional colors used include red, black, yellow, green and blue. "The red was obtained from hematite, the black from graphite and carbon and green/blue from various copper ores". they tell a story of the northwest culture.

== Agents of deterioration ==
Totem poles can be either displayed outdoors or indoors. Agents of deterioration that can impact totem poles are direct sunlight, moisture, fire, infestation, pollutants, fluctuating temperatures, relative humidity and theft and vandalism. Outdoor poles that are exposed to agents of deterioration are affected year round by rain, pollutants, infestation and biological growth and light. The areas where totem poles originate from have a heavy annual accumulation of rainfall. "Therefore, the major problem of outdoor totem poles is deterioration at the paint-wood surface" When it rains, the moisture can become trapped in the space between the paint and the wood and can cause deterioration. Direct sunlight can cause paint colors to fade and patina. Fluctuating temperatures, weather and relative humidity can cause the pole to crack or check. When it rains, the pole can absorb moisture and then the pole swells. "Because wood always remains hydroscopic: it absorbs moisture into its cell walls as relative humidity rises and releases water back into the atmosphere as relative humidity falls". The absorption and releasing of moisture back into the atmosphere can cause the wood to shrink and swell which causes the cracking and checking of wood.

Because totem poles are created from an organic material they can be a place of habitat for many diverse species. They can become an ideal home for many insects such as wasps, bees, carpenter ants or termites. In addition, poles make great homes for birds as many nests have been found at the top of poles. Biological growth can develop on the exterior or interior of poles. "Biological growth has contributed to structural deterioration of the wood". Examples of biological growth can include moss, lichens, root systems and plants.

Over the past decade some totem poles have been known to be stolen while on display outdoors. An 18-foot pole was stolen from a park in West Seattle, Washington by a man who had the vision of installing it in his front yard. The pole was later recovered, along with another pole that was stolen from a nearby town and erected again back in the park. In addition to being looted, poles have been vandalized. On May 17, 1977, entrance poles to the Tulalip Indian Reservation in the State of Washington were cut down with a chainsaw.

== Conservation treatments ==
Prior to performing any conservation work, a condition assessment is performed. During an assessment the conservator identifies the materials used for the object and how the object was constructed. "In assessing the condition of a piece, it is also important to consider the factors that may have contributed to its present condition-former use, cultural modifications, previous environments, prior treatments, as well as storage and/or display conditions". During an assessment, time "may be spent photographing, taking condition notes, measuring cracks and probing the wood with an ice pick".

Following the assessment, a treatment plan is developed. The treatment plan will depend on the plan or outcome of the pole such as indoor exhibition, storage our outdoor display. "Decisions about appropriate treatments and methods of preservation for individual artifacts therefore should be made by a conservator in consultation with experts in the culture". Conservation goals for totem poles can include stabilization of materials such as wood, paint or loose joints, removal of biological growth, surface cleaning, application of a water or insect repellents, removal of decayed wood, stabilizing of totem at base and in some cases the removal of the totem pole. Conservators who perform treatments on a pole document any work performed via photographs or written notes. A surface cleaning is a common treatment by conservators. The surface cleaning is generally performed with a low-suction vacuum, soft brushes, mild detergent and soft sponges. Cleanings are important for removing any dirt, grime, grease, pollution or dust from the pole's surface. It is recommended by conservators to start at the top and work your way down. Scaffolding or a lift is used with taller poles.

Another treatment done by conservators is the removal of biological growth. Conservators often use scrapers such as popsicle sticks or bamboo skewers to scrape off the surface. Sometimes poles may have trees, roots or grass growing inside of them. In this situation, "it is probably better to cut the growth off flush with the wood, since pulling out big roots can cause more damage and create empty space for water to pool".

Another example of a treatment often performed by conservators is the consolidation of the pole's surface which can be performed in a variety of methods. In a paper presented at the 42nd annual American Institute of Conservation of Historic and Artistic Works discusses the utilization of Butvar B-98 and Paraloid B-72 as the selected adhesives for consolidating splinters and detached fragments. Another method for consolidating wood is with the use of epoxy. Epoxy is a method for adhering smaller fragments of wood or larger wood fragments such as wings, beaks or fins of animals. "Epoxy repairs are difficult to reverse without harming the wood, and skill and experience are required to select and apply epoxies, bulking agents and tinting products". Materials used to consolidate paint surfaces are Acryloid B-72 in acetone which is applied with a brush. Last, a necessary and common treatment is an insect treatment. A product often used by conservators for infestation is Bora-care. This product is ingested by insects and impedes their ability to digest and thus starves them to death.

== Maintenance ==
If one is the custodian of a pole, it is recommended to develop a maintenance plan. It is preferable to have the maintenance performed by a professional conservator. "The maintenance of a pole can include the removal of vegetation and an application of a water repellent. During a maintenance routine check, the stability of the base of the pole is tested. The base of the pole is checked for rot and decay and can be done with a resistograph. "The resistograph uses a very fine drill bit 20" long which gives graphic chart readings as it penetrates the wood". Testing the density of the base is important to ensure the safety of the public so the pole does not fall down. In addition to checking for decay and stability, any loose fragments can be repaired or removed. Last, any type of insect or biological growth can be documented and treated. Photographs and documentation help keep track of the condition of the pole throughout the years.

== Preventive conservation ==
It is difficult to mitigate against agents of deterioration such as rain, sunlight or fluctuating temperatures when a pole is displayed outdoors. It is important to follow a strict maintenance program to minimize future deterioration. The management of moisture is important for preservation. One method that has been used to prevent absorption of water at the end grain of the wood is through the fabrication of a custom fitting cap. Caps can be made with copper sheeting or sheet lead. One concern conservators have posed with the use of caps, is the potential of moisture getting trapped underneath. Poles that were capped in Sitka Historical Park in Sitka, Alaska "were found in much better condition than the poles that were not capped".

It is recommended that if poles are stored or displayed indoors, then they should have minimal exposure to direct lighting sources. Many museums install UV filters when poles are on display indoors. Other recommendations for indoor storage include a climate-controlled environment, no food or beverages in the vicinity of any poles, a 24-hour security system and having active security guards on duty. Last, museums typically have a barrier between the visitor and the object on display. Continual touching of a pole can cause irreversible damage such as the absorption of skin oil into the wood.

== Restoration ==
There have been previous cases where restoration of a totem pole takes place in lieu of the preservation of existing materials. Restoration practices can include the replacement of wood or repainting. Many cases of the repainting of poles most often occurred only when the original paint patterns were known. It is also recommended if any type of repainting or replacement of fragments of the pole is to take place, it should involve the consulting with the appropriate Native carver or carvers.

== Examples of totem pole conservation-restoration projects ==
- Ellen Carrlee Conservation Blog-Totem Pole Maintenance
- Ron Sheetz-Preservation Assessment of Totem Poles . Totem Bight State Historical Park. Ketchikan, Alaska.
- Kate Brugioni-Painted Totem Poles at the American Museum of Natural History: Treatment Challenges and Solutions.

== Past conferences and workshops dedicated to the care of poles ==
- Caring for Totem Poles Workshop at the Kitselas Canyon National Historic Site near Terrace, British Columbia, October 4-7, 2010
- Wood Science for Conservation of Cultural heritage
- International Conference on Wooden Cultural Heritage: Evaluation of Deterioration and Management of Change, Hamburg (Germany), 7-10 October 2009
- Caring for Totem Poles Workshop at the Tulalip Tribes' Hibulb Cultural Center & Natural History Preserve July 23 & 24, 2014
- Poles, Posts & Canoes Symposium at the Tulalip Tribes' Hibulb Cultural Center & Natural History Preserve July 21 & 22, 2014
