= Resistograph =

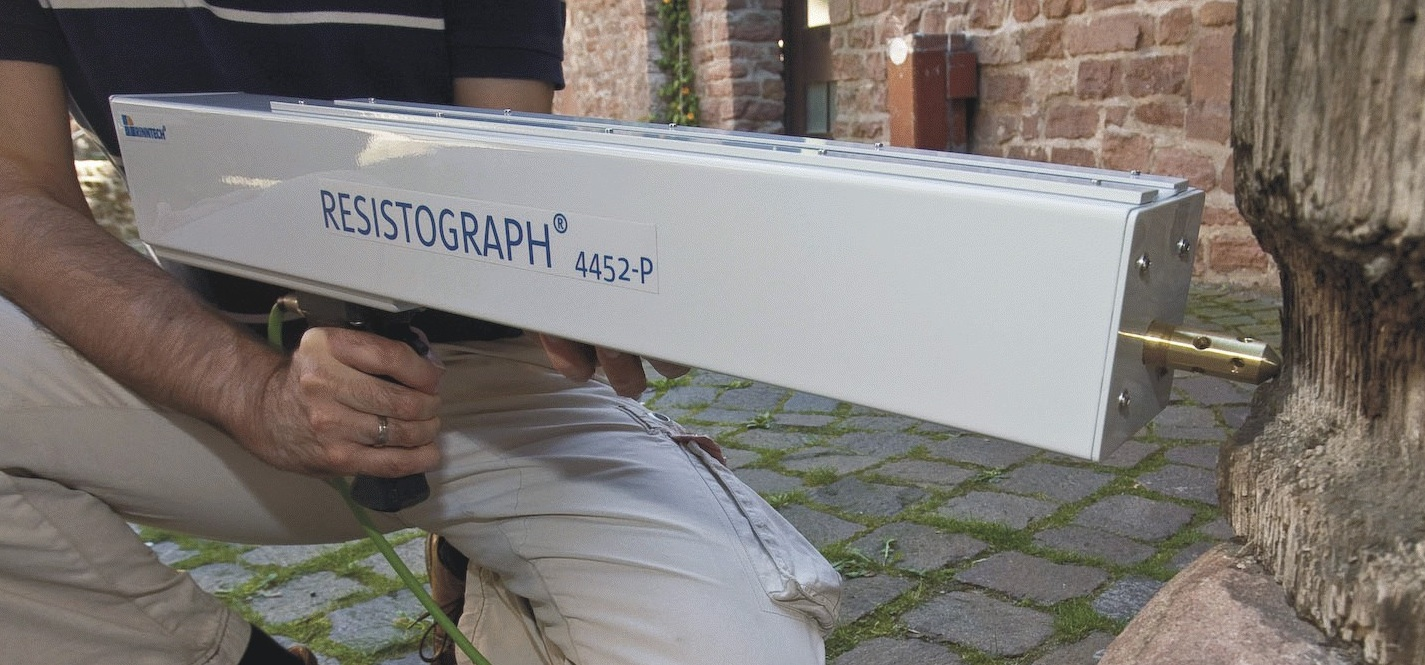
Rinntech Resistograph for wood density analysis

Resistograph is a mechanical resistance measurement device, developed by Frank Rinn (since 1986 in Heidelberg, Germany).

Driven by a drill motor, a long, thin needle is inserted into a wood log or structural wood beam in order to gain an idea of its density, often to identify areas of substandard structural integrity such as decay. Variations in resistance to torque are recorded by a stylus on graph paper. Newer models may record information digitally but the purpose of the instrument is the same.

== Literature ==
- Rinn F. (1988): Eine neue Methode zur Bestimmung von Jahrringparametern. Physik-Diplomarbeit, 85 Seiten, Universität Heidelberg.
- Rinn, F. (1989): Eine neue Bohrmethode zur Holzuntersuchung. Holz-Zentralblatt 115, (34): S. 529-530.
- Rinn, F. (1990): Vorrichtung zur Materialprüfung, insbesondere Holzprüfung durch Bohr- bzw. Eindringwiderstandsmessung. Patent DE4122494B4, Prioritätsdatum 3. September 1990.
- Rinn, F., Becker, B., Kromer, B. 1990: Density Profiles of Conifers and Deciduous Trees. Report of the Symposium on Tree Rings and Environment of Lund University, Ystad, South Sweden, September 1990.
- Eckstein, D. und U. Saß: Holzanatomische Untersuchungen zu Bohrwiderstandsmessungen an Laubhölzern Holz als Roh- und Werkstoff, (1994) Holzforschung 52, S. 279-286
- Rinn, F, Schweingruber, F.H., Schär, E., (1996): RESISTOGRAPH and X-ray density charts of wood comparative evaluation of drill resistance profiles and X-ray density charts of different wood species. Holzforschung 50: (4), 303-311.
