= Columbia Peak (Alaska) =

Mountain in Alaska, United States

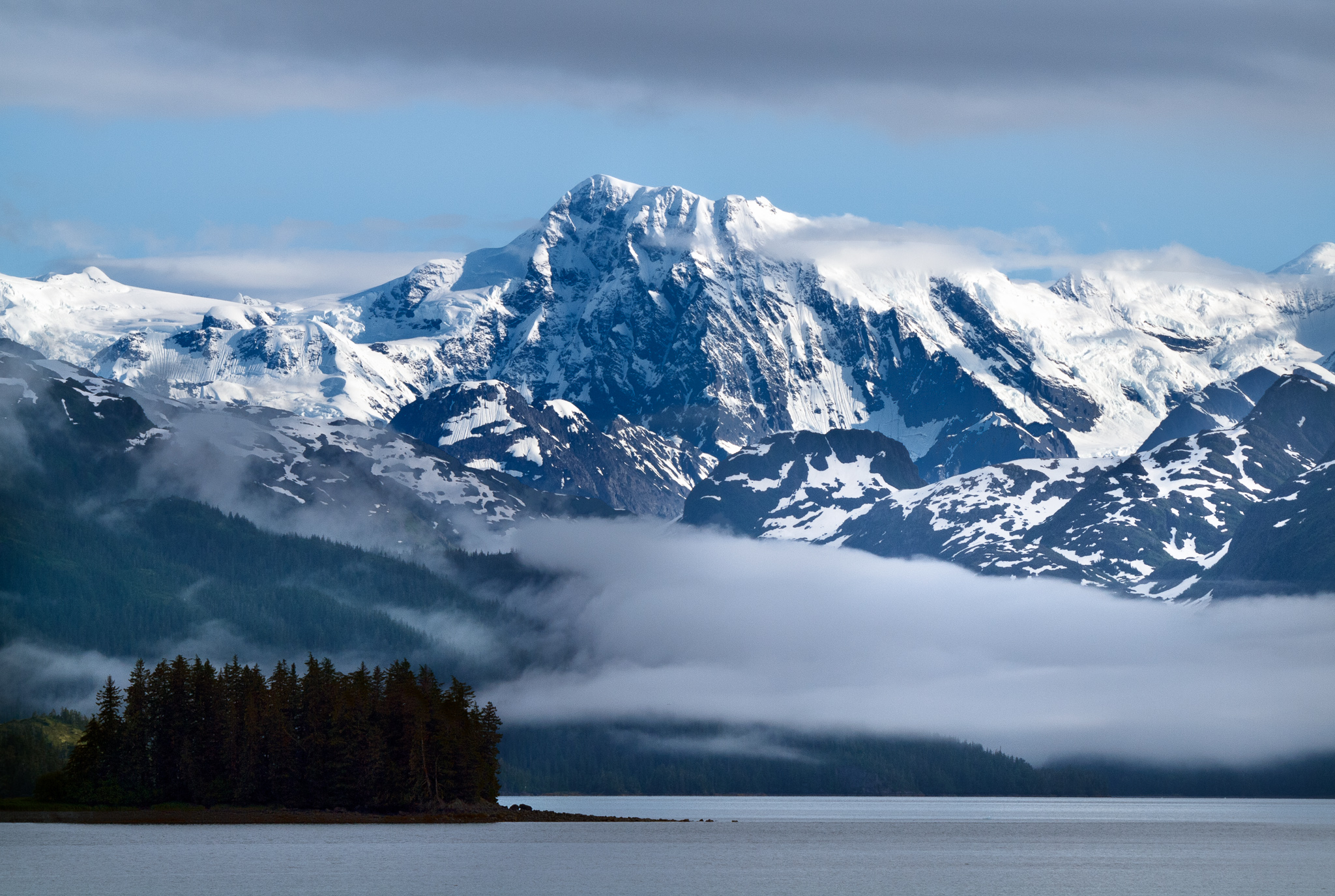
- Columbia Peak from Prince William Sound

Highest point
- Elevation: 9,489 ft (2,892 m)
- Prominence: 2,189 ft (667 m)
- Parent peak: Mount Einstein (11,552 ft)
- Isolation: 3.9 mi (6.3 km)
- Coordinates: 61°14′36″N 147°12′01″W

Geography
- Location within Alaska
- Interactive map of Columbia Peak
- Location: Chugach National Forest; Chugach Census Area; Alaska, United States
- Parent range: Chugach Mountains
- Topo map: USGS Anchorage A-1

Columbia Peak is a 9,489-foot (2,892 m) elevation glaciated summit located 32 mi (51 km) northwest of Valdez in the Chugach Mountains of the U.S. state of Alaska. This remote mountain is situated 2.5 mi (4 km) west-southwest of Mount Defiant, near the head of Meares Glacier, between the First Branch and Second Branch Columbia Glacier, on land managed by Chugach National Forest. Columbia Peak is named in association with the Columbia Glacier, which in turn was named after Columbia University, and is one of several glaciers in the area named for elite U.S. colleges by the Harriman Alaska expedition in 1899. The mountain's local name was reported in 1906 by the United States Geological Survey.

== Climate ==
Based on the Köppen climate classification, Columbia Peak is located in a subarctic climate zone with long, cold, snowy winters, and mild summers. Weather systems coming off the Gulf of Alaska are forced upwards by the Chugach Mountains (orographic lift), causing heavy precipitation in the form of rainfall and snowfall. Winter temperatures can drop below −20 °C with wind chill factors below −30 °C. This climate supports the Meares and Columbia Glaciers surrounding this mountain. The months May through June offer the most favorable weather for climbing or viewing.

== Gallery ==
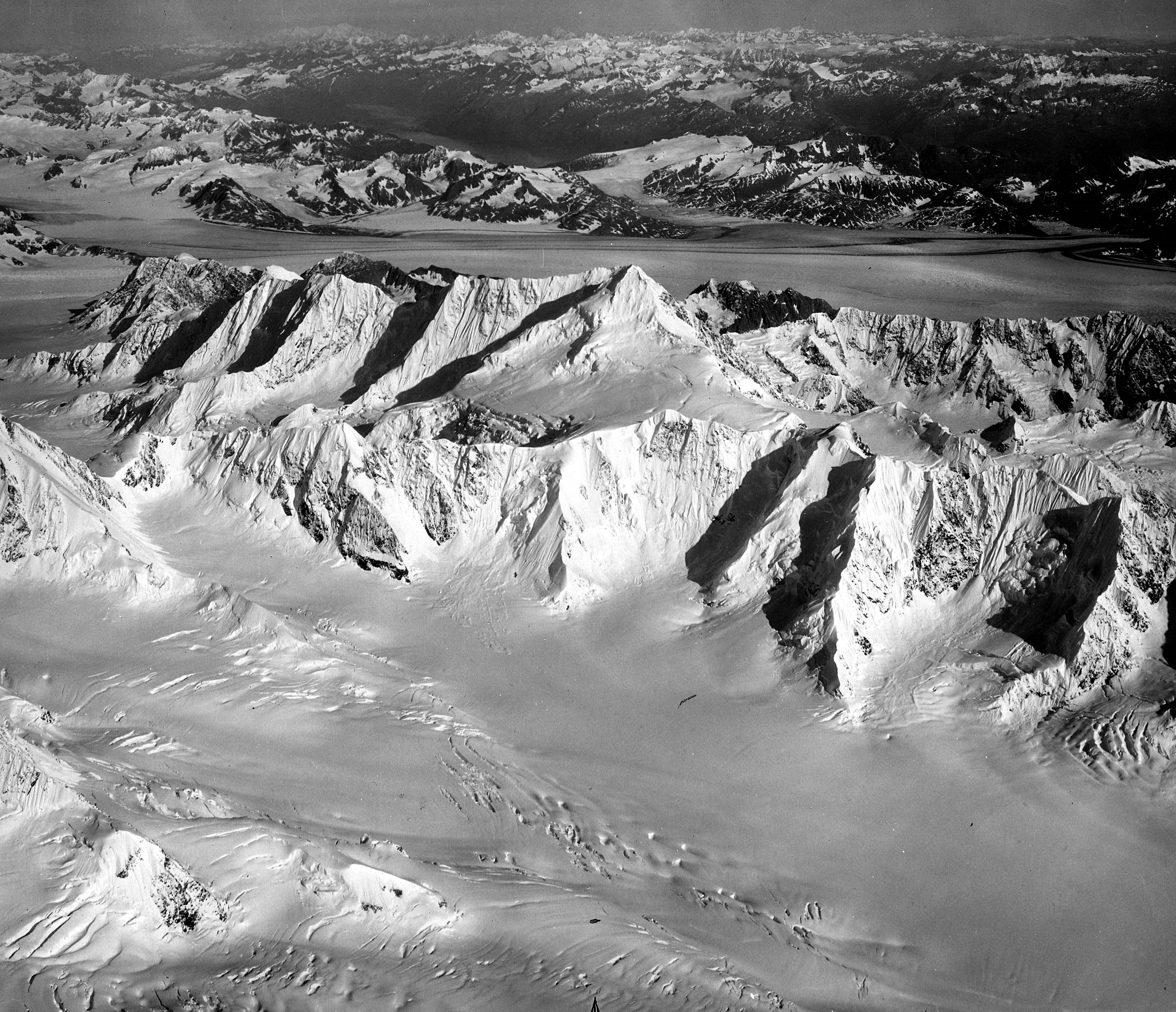
Columbia Peak (centered) from the northwest

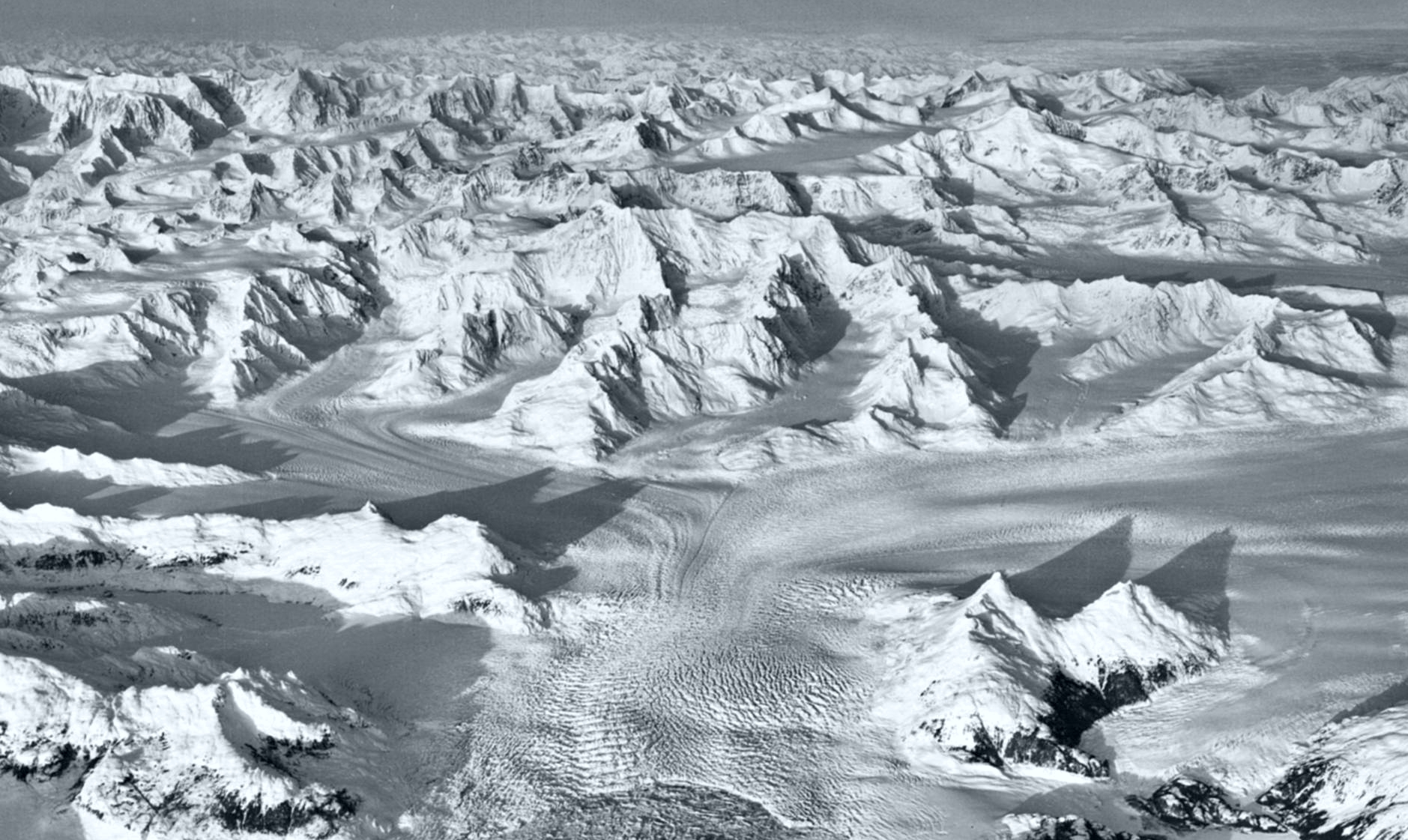
Columbia Peak (centered) with Great Nunatak in lower right. (from the south)

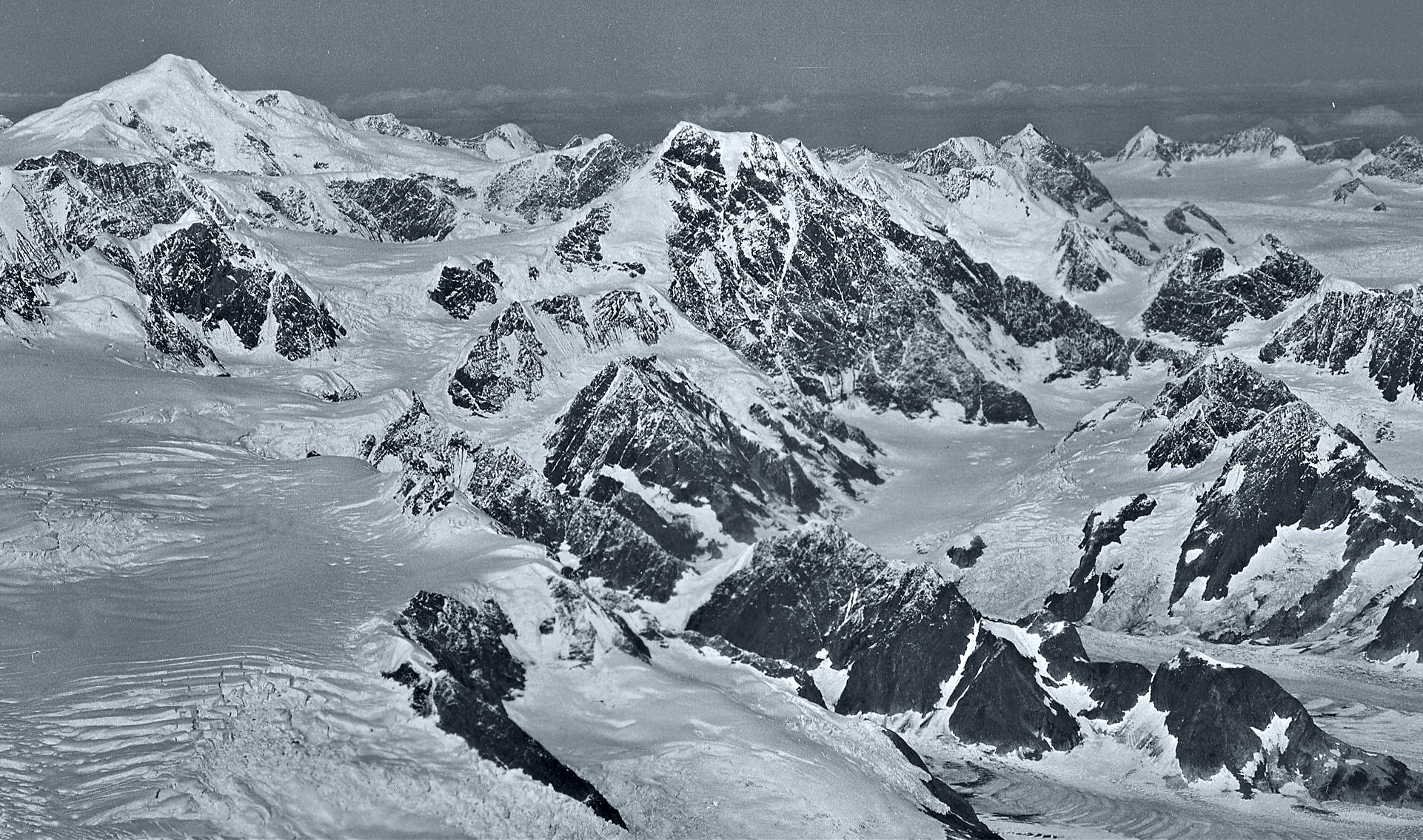
Aerial from SW with Columbia Peak centered. Mount Einstein in upper left.

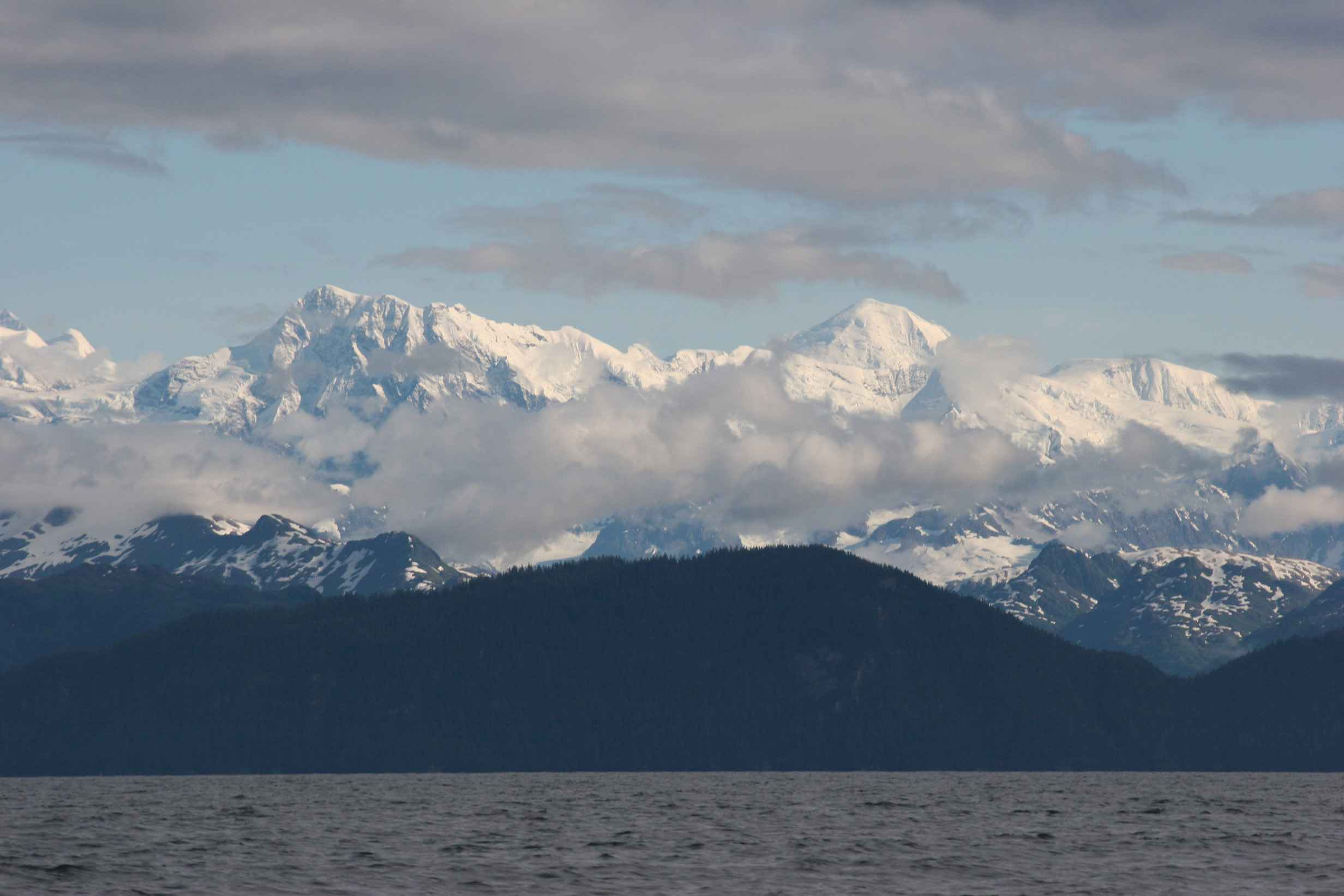
Columbia Peak (left) with Mt. Einstein (right)

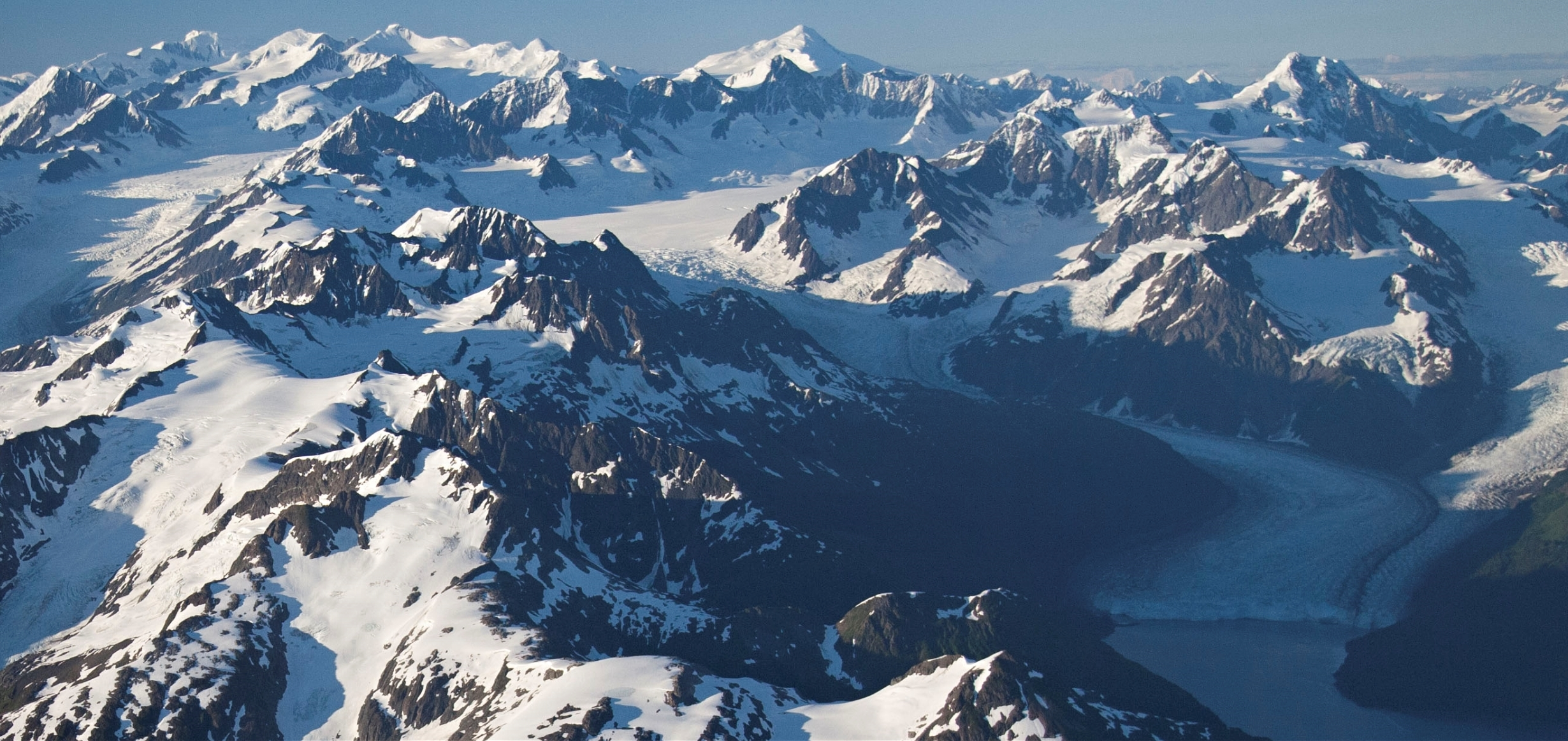
Columbia Peak in upper right corner of frame behind Mount Grosvenor

== See also ==
- List of mountain peaks of Alaska
- Geography of Alaska
