= Mount Grosvenor =

Mountain in Alaska, United States

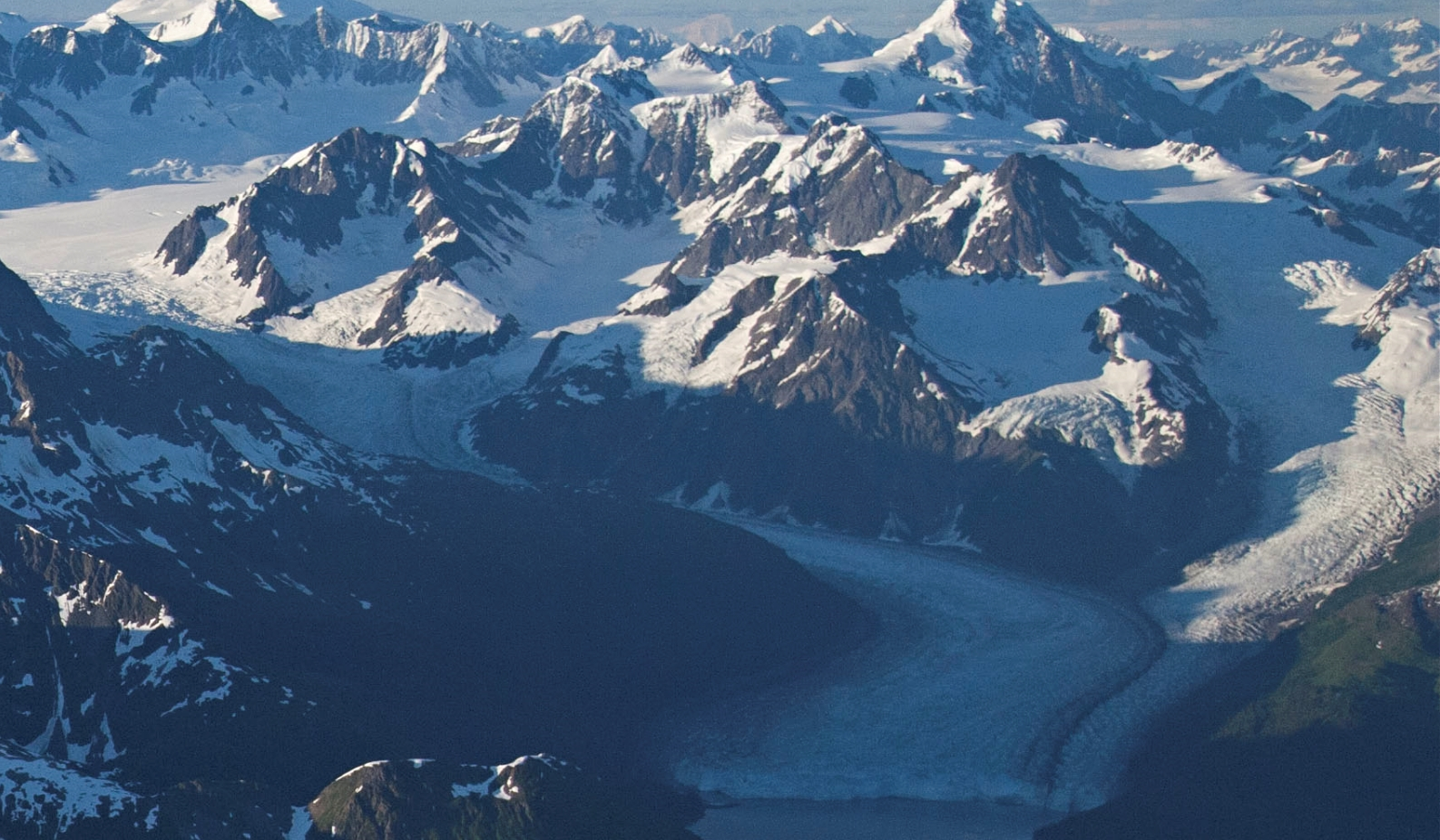
- Aerial view of west aspect

Highest point
- Elevation: 5,540 ft (1,690 m)
- Prominence: 653 ft (199 m)
- Parent peak: Columbia Peak (9,489 ft)
- Isolation: 1.34 mi (2.16 km)
- Coordinates: 61°11′01″N 147°25′45″W

Geography
- Location within Alaska
- Interactive map of Mount Grosvenor
- Location: Chugach National Forest; Chugach Census Area; Alaska, United States
- Parent range: Chugach Mountains
- Topo map: USGS Anchorage A-2

Mount Grosvenor is a 5,540-foot (1,689 m) elevation glaciated summit located 39 mi (63 km) west of Valdez in the Chugach Mountains of the U.S. state of Alaska, on land managed by Chugach National Forest. Although modest in elevation, relief is significant since the mountain rises from tidewater at Unakwik Inlet of Prince William Sound in approximately three miles. The mountain's name was applied in 1910 by Lawrence Martin, and officially adopted by the United States Geological Survey. This peak's name honors Gilbert Hovey Grosvenor (1875–1966), President of the National Geographic Society, father of photojournalism, and the first full-time editor of National Geographic magazine.

== Climate ==
Based on the Köppen climate classification, Mount Grosvenor is located in a subarctic climate zone with long, cold, snowy winters, and mild summers. Weather systems coming off the Gulf of Alaska are forced upwards by the Chugach Mountains (orographic lift), causing heavy precipitation in the form of rainfall and snowfall. Temperatures can drop below −20 °C with wind chill factors below −30 °C. This climate supports the Meares and Columbia Glaciers surrounding this mountain. The months May through June offer the most favorable weather for climbing or viewing.

== Gallery ==
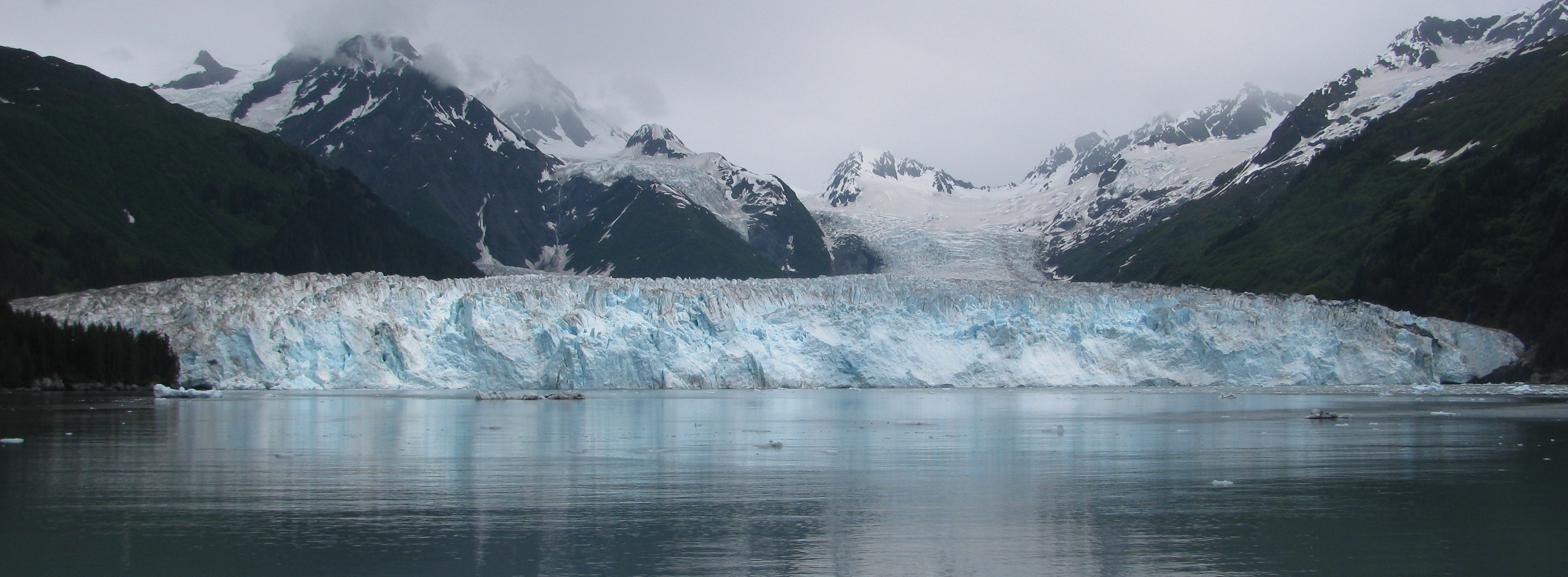
Mount Grosvenor (left) partially in clouds behind Meares Glacier

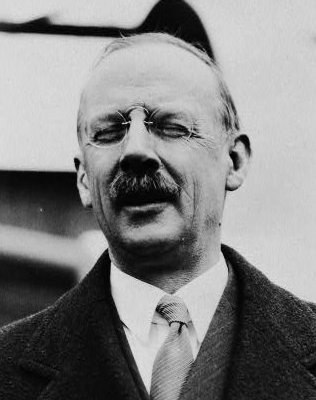
Grosvenor, 1927

== See also ==
- List of mountain peaks of Alaska
- Geography of Alaska
