= Mount Defiant =

Mountain in Alaska, United States

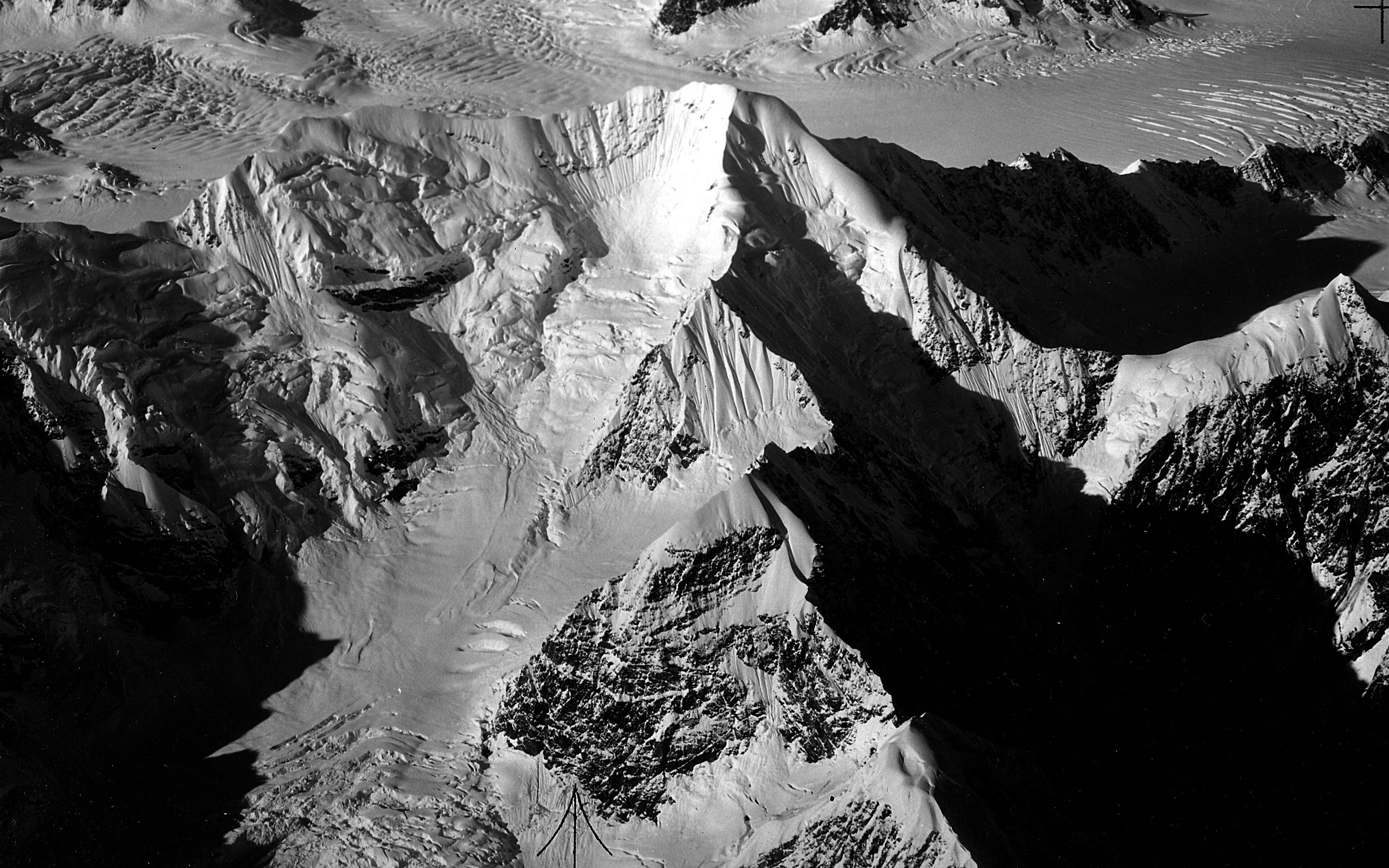
- Aerial view from the south

Highest point
- Elevation: 8,348 ft (2,544 m)
- Prominence: 98 ft (30 m)
- Isolation: 0.73 mi (1.17 km)
- Coordinates: 61°15′17″N 147°07′36″W

Geography
- Location within Alaska
- Interactive map of Mount Defiant
- Location: Chugach National Forest; Chugach Census Area; Alaska, United States
- Parent range: Chugach Mountains
- Topo map: USGS Anchorage B-1

Mount Defiant is an 8,348-foot (2,544 m) elevation glaciated summit located 32 mi (51 km) northwest of Valdez in the Chugach Mountains of the U.S. state of Alaska. This remote mountain is situated 2.5 mi (4 km) east-northeast of Columbia Peak, 6.5 mi (10 km) south of Mount Einstein, near the head of Columbia Glacier's Second Branch, on land managed by Chugach National Forest. Mount Defiant was named in 1957 by members of the Chugach Mountains Expedition which was sponsored by the Arctic Institute of North America, because the rugged ice-covered peak defied all their attempts to find a route to the summit. The mountain's name was officially adopted in 1965 by the U.S. Board on Geographic Names.

== Climate ==
Based on the Köppen climate classification, Mount Defiant is located in a subarctic climate zone with long, cold, snowy winters, and mild summers. Weather systems coming off the Gulf of Alaska are forced upwards by the Chugach Mountains (orographic lift), causing heavy precipitation in the form of rainfall and snowfall. Temperatures can drop below −20 °C with wind chill factors below −30 °C. This climate supports hanging glaciers on the slopes and the immense Columbia Glacier surrounding this mountain. The months May through June offer the most favorable weather for climbing or viewing.

== Gallery ==
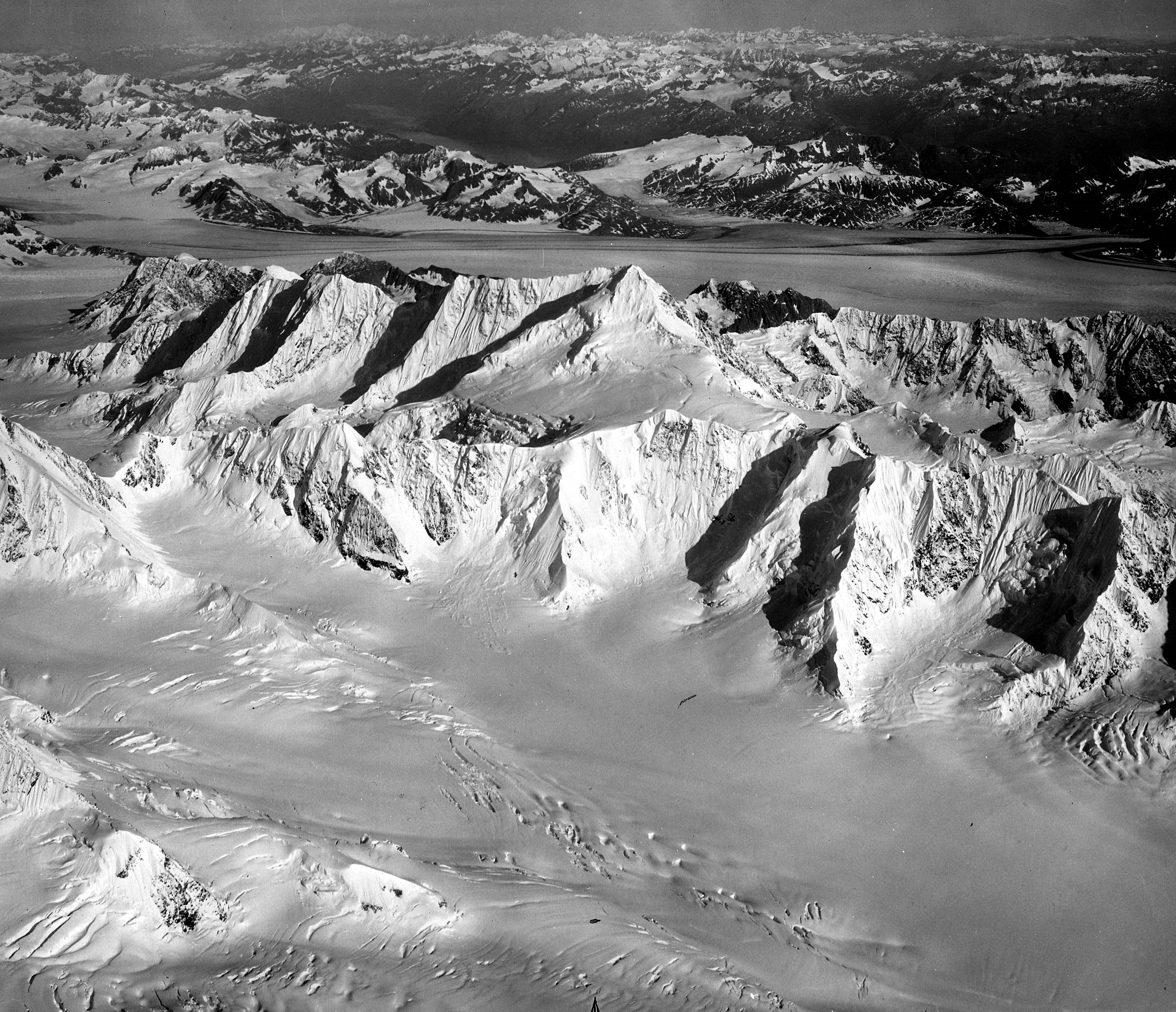
Columbia Peak (centered) with Mt. Defiant to left, from NW

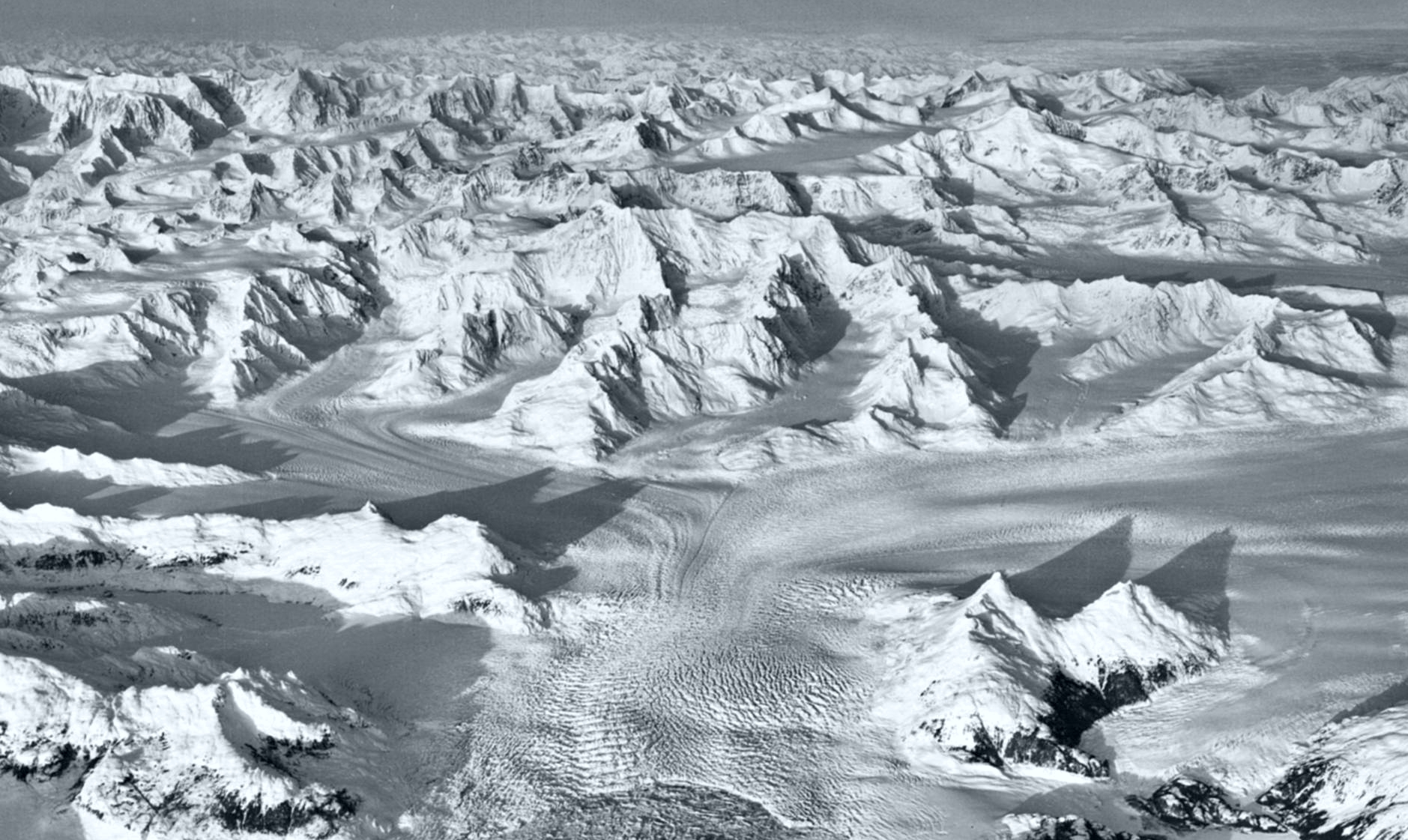
Columbia Peak and Mt. Defiant (centered) with Great Nunatak in lower right. (from south)

== See also ==
- List of mountain peaks of Alaska
- Geography of Alaska
