= Mount Defiance =

Mount Defiance may refer to:

In Australia

| Name | Elevation | Coordinates | Map number | Gazetteer of Australia reference |
|---|---|---|---|---|
| Mount Defiance (Victoria) | | 38°34′36″S 143°54′57″E | 7420 | "Mount Defiance". Gazetteer of Australia online. Geoscience Australia, Australian Government. |

In the United States

| Name | Elevation | Coordinates | USGS Map | GNIS ID |
|---|---|---|---|---|
| Mount Defiance (California) | 2,615 ft (797 m) | 36°28′01″N 121°10′20″W | North Chalone Peak | 241384 |
| Mount Defiance (New Jersey) | 1,030 ft (310 m) | 41°07′26″N 074°13′46″W | Ramsey | 875865 |
| Mount Defiance (New York) | 823 ft (251 m) | 43°49′53″N 073°24′24″W | Ticonderoga | 974766 |
| Mount Defiance (Oregon) | 4,934 ft (1,504 m) | 45°38′54″N 121°43′20″W | Mount Defiance | 1140872 |
| Mount Defiance (Tennessee) | 1,309 ft (399 m) | 36°04′27″N 086°09′43″W | Watertown | 1282310 |
| Mount Defiance (Washington) | 5,446 ft (1,660 m) | 47°26′05″N 121°33′53″W | Bandera | 1518660 |

== See also ==
- Defiance Mountain
- Mount Defiant
