= Defiance Mountain =

Mountain in British Columbia, Canada

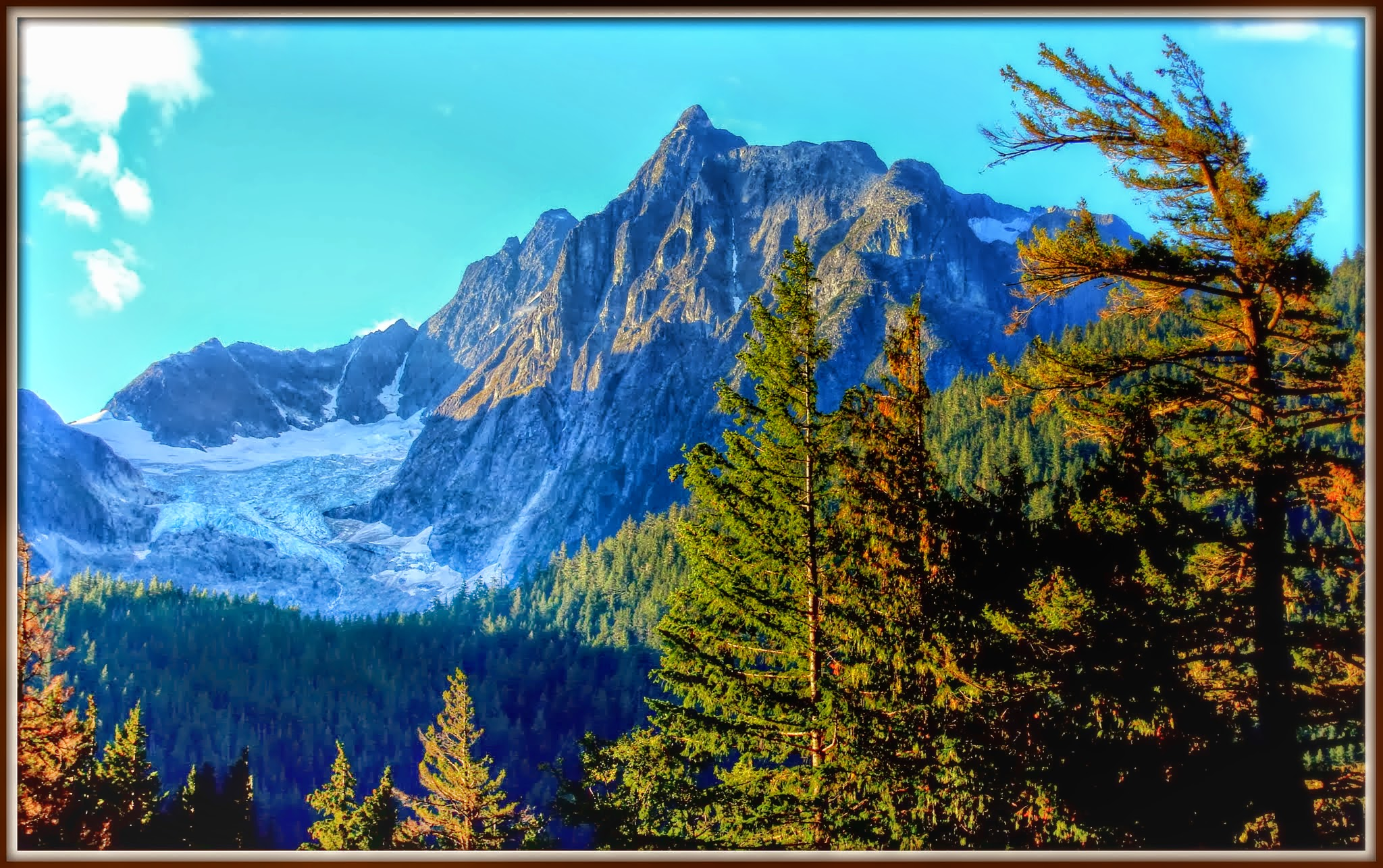
- North aspect

Highest point
- Elevation: 2,659 m (8,724 ft)
- Prominence: 781 m (2,562 ft)
- Parent peak: The Horn (2,907 m)
- Isolation: 6.4 km (4.0 mi)
- Coordinates: 52°22′15″N 126°18′39″W

Geography
- Location within British Columbia Location within Canada
- Interactive map of Defiance Mountain
- Country: Canada
- Province: British Columbia
- District: Range 3 Coast Land District
- Parent range: Coast Mountains
- Topo map: NTS 93D8 Stuie

Defiance Mountain is a 2,659-metre-elevation (8,724-foot) summit in the northernmost Pacific Ranges of the Coast Mountains of British Columbia, Canada. It is located to the south of the Bella Coola River between the communities of Firvale and Hagensborg. Nusatsum Mountain is to its northwest and Stupendous Mountain to the northeast. The peak can be seen from Highway 20. The landform's toponym was officially adopted March 13, 1947, by the Geographical Names Board of Canada.

== Climate ==
Based on the Köppen climate classification, Defiance Mountain is located in the marine west coast climate zone of western North America. Most weather fronts originate in the Pacific Ocean, and travel east toward the Coast Mountains where they are forced upward by the range (Orographic lift), causing them to drop their moisture in the form of rain or snowfall. As a result, the Coast Mountains experience high precipitation, especially during the winter months in the form of snowfall. Winter temperatures can drop below −20 °C with wind chill factors below −30 °C. This climate supports a glacier in the north cirque.

== See also ==
- Mount Defiance
- Geography of British Columbia
