= Alaska Gold Rush (disambiguation) =

The Alaska Gold Rush was a gold rush in the Klondike region of the Yukon in Canada from 1896 to 1899.

Alaska Gold Rush may also refer to:

- Nome Gold Rush, a gold rush in Nome, Alaska, approximately 1899–1909
- Fairbanks Gold Rush, a gold rush in Fairbanks, Alaska, in the early 1900s
- Gold Rush: Alaska, a reality television series on Discovery
- The Alaska Gold Rush, a 1960 book by May McNeer
- The Alaska Gold Rush, a 1972 book by David B. Wharton
