= Gravina Island (Prince William Sound) =

Island in Alaska, United States

- Location within Alaska

Geography
- Location: Chugach National Forest
- Coordinates: 60.640099°N 146.291244°W

Gravina Island is an island within the Chugach National Forest in Prince William Sound.
