= Great Nunatak =

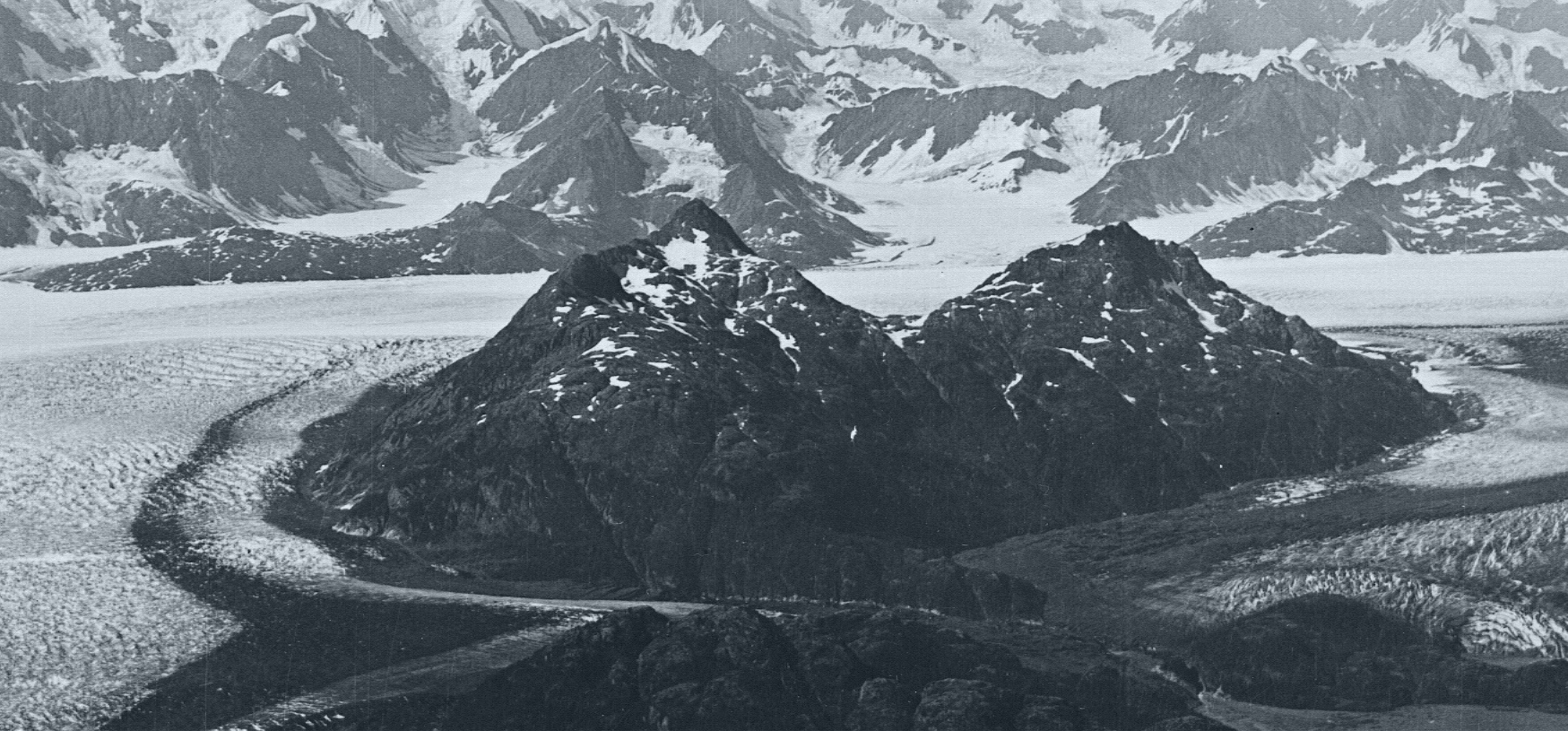
- Aerial view from the south in 1934

Highest point
- Elevation: 3,652 ft (1,113 m)
- Prominence: 1,952 ft (595 m)
- Isolation: 3.33 mi (5.36 km)
- Coordinates: 61°06′27″N 147°00′58″W

Geography
- Location within Alaska
- Interactive map of Great Nunatak
- Location: Chugach National Forest; Chugach Census Area; Alaska, United States
- Parent range: Chugach Mountains
- Topo map: USGS Anchorage A-1

Great Nunatak is a 3,652-foot (1,113 m) elevation summit located 21 mi (34 km) west of Valdez in the Chugach Mountains of the U.S. state of Alaska. This remote mountain is situated near the terminus of the Columbia Glacier, 11 mi (18 km) southeast of Columbia Peak, on land managed by Chugach National Forest. This 2.2-mile long feature has a secondary summit, elevation 3,412 ft. Great Nunatak traces its name to Grove Karl Gilbert, a geologist with the United States Geological Survey who was part of the 1899 Harriman Alaska expedition that explored this area. He believed it to be the largest nunatak in Alaska when he casually referred to it as "the great nunatak" in a 1902 publication. The mountain's toponym was officially adopted in 1975 by the U.S. Board on Geographic Names. While the name remains, its status as a nunatak is obsolete because glacier lobes that once barely touched, now no longer completely encircle this landform as the Columbia Glacier retreats, and tidewater of Columbia Bay replaces the ice on the north and west aspects of the mountain.

== Climate ==
Based on the Köppen climate classification, Great Nunatak is located in a subarctic climate zone with long, cold, snowy winters, and mild summers. Weather systems coming off the Gulf of Alaska are forced upwards by the Chugach Mountains (orographic lift), causing heavy precipitation in the form of rainfall and snowfall. Winter temperatures can drop below 0 °F with wind chill factors below −10 °F. This climate supports the Columbia Glacier near this mountain. The months May through June offer the most favorable weather for climbing or viewing.

== Gallery ==
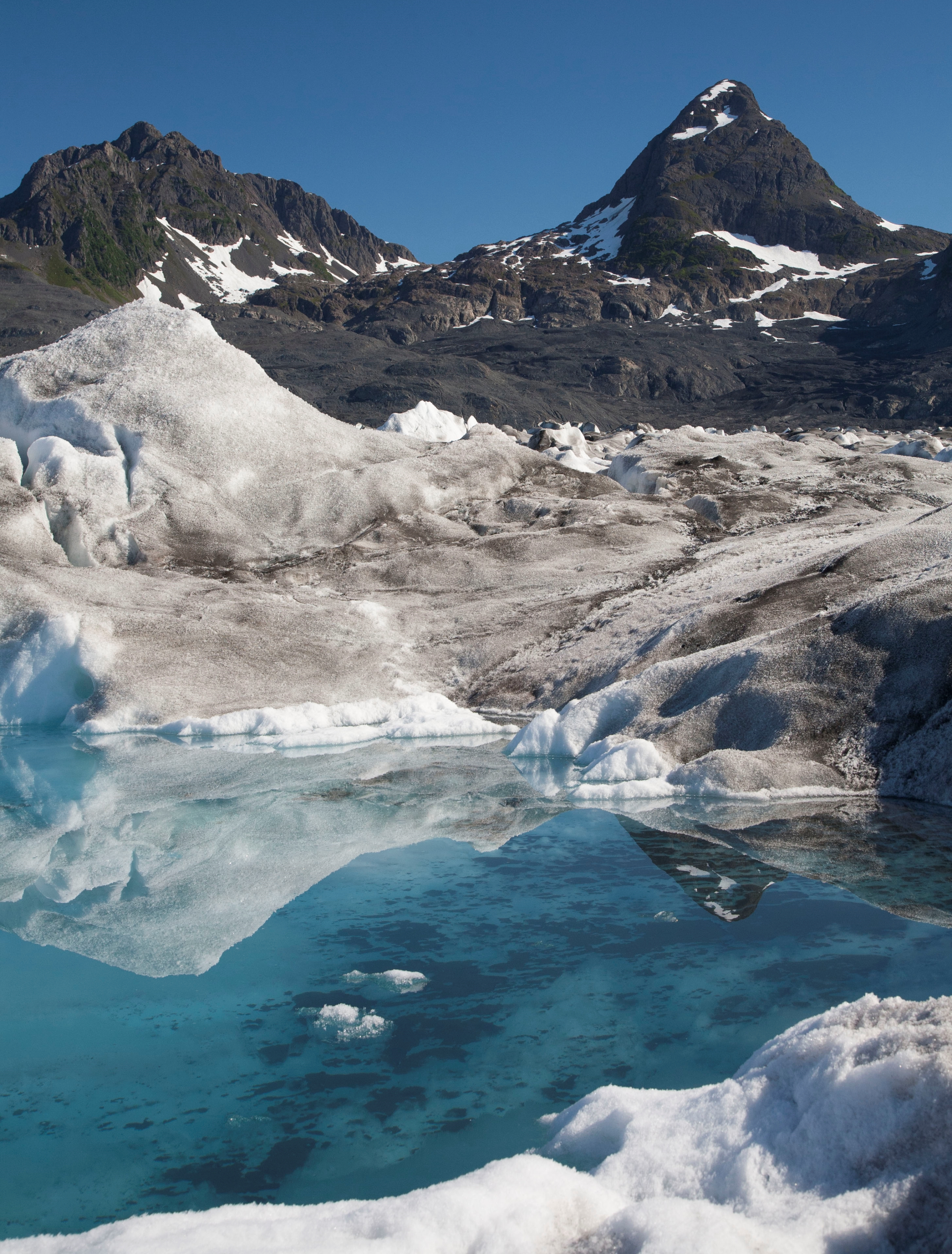
North aspect in 2006

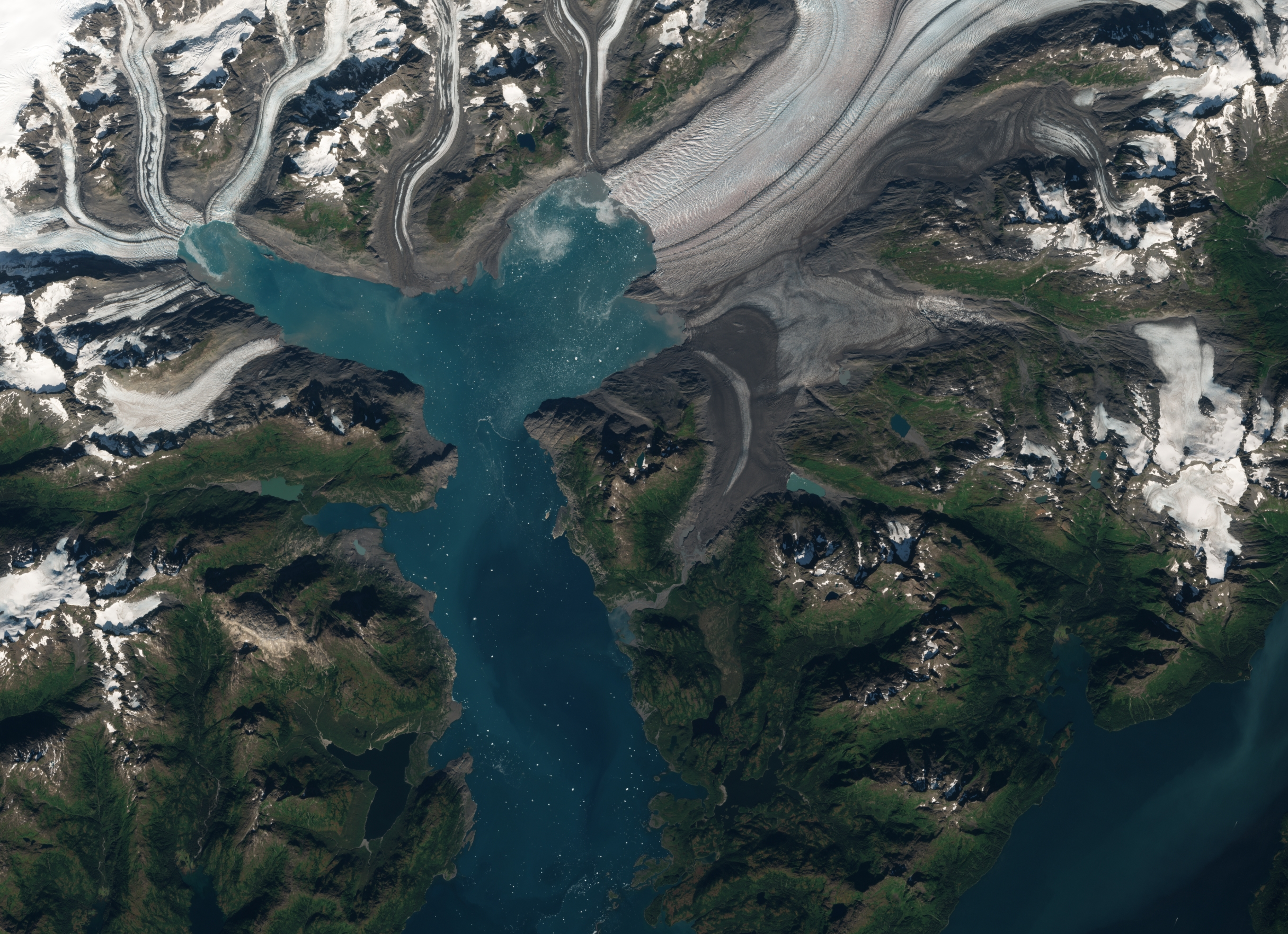
Satellite view in 2018 showing tidewater on the north and west sides of Great Nunatak (in bullseye)

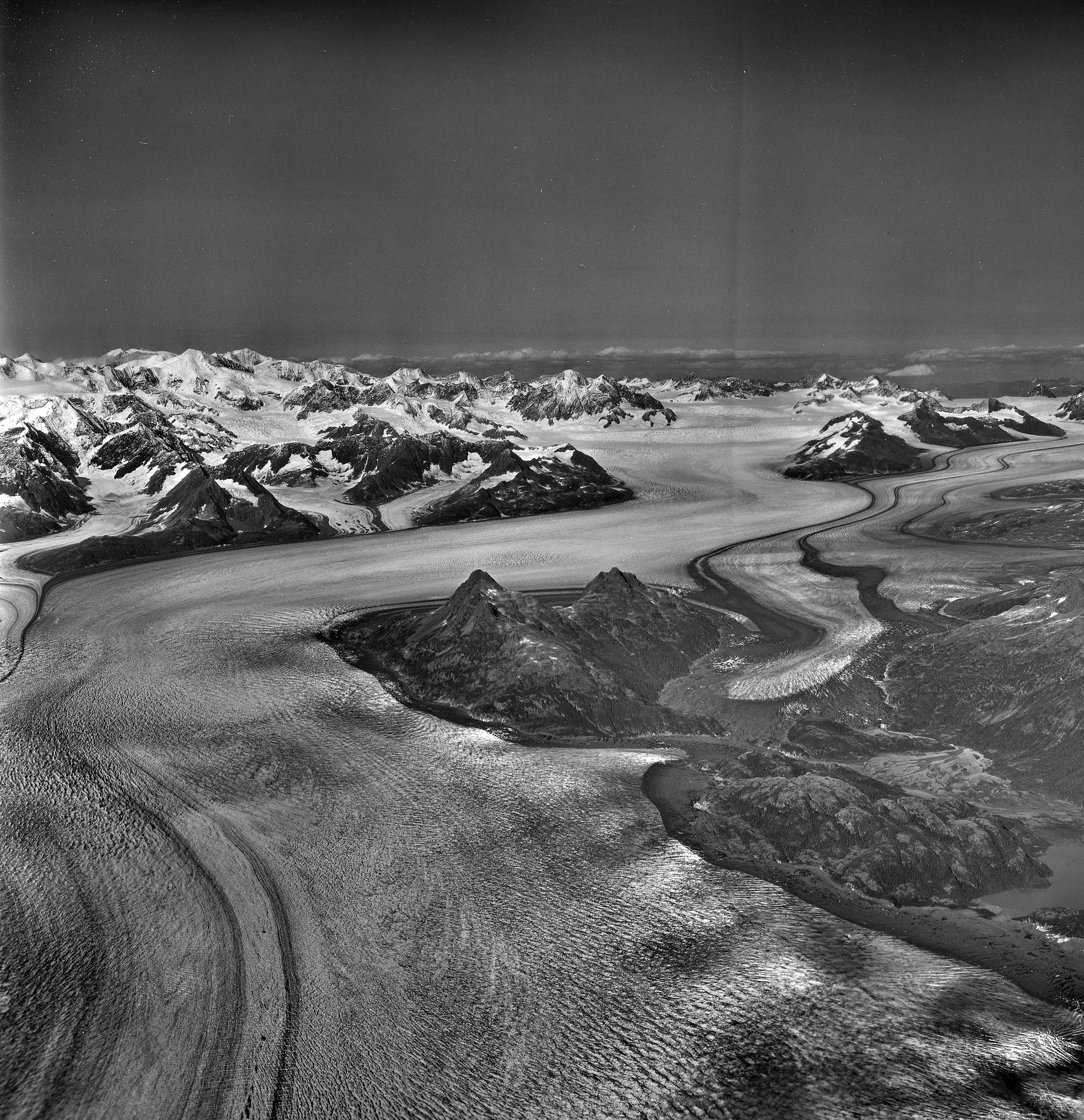
Great Nunatak in 1969

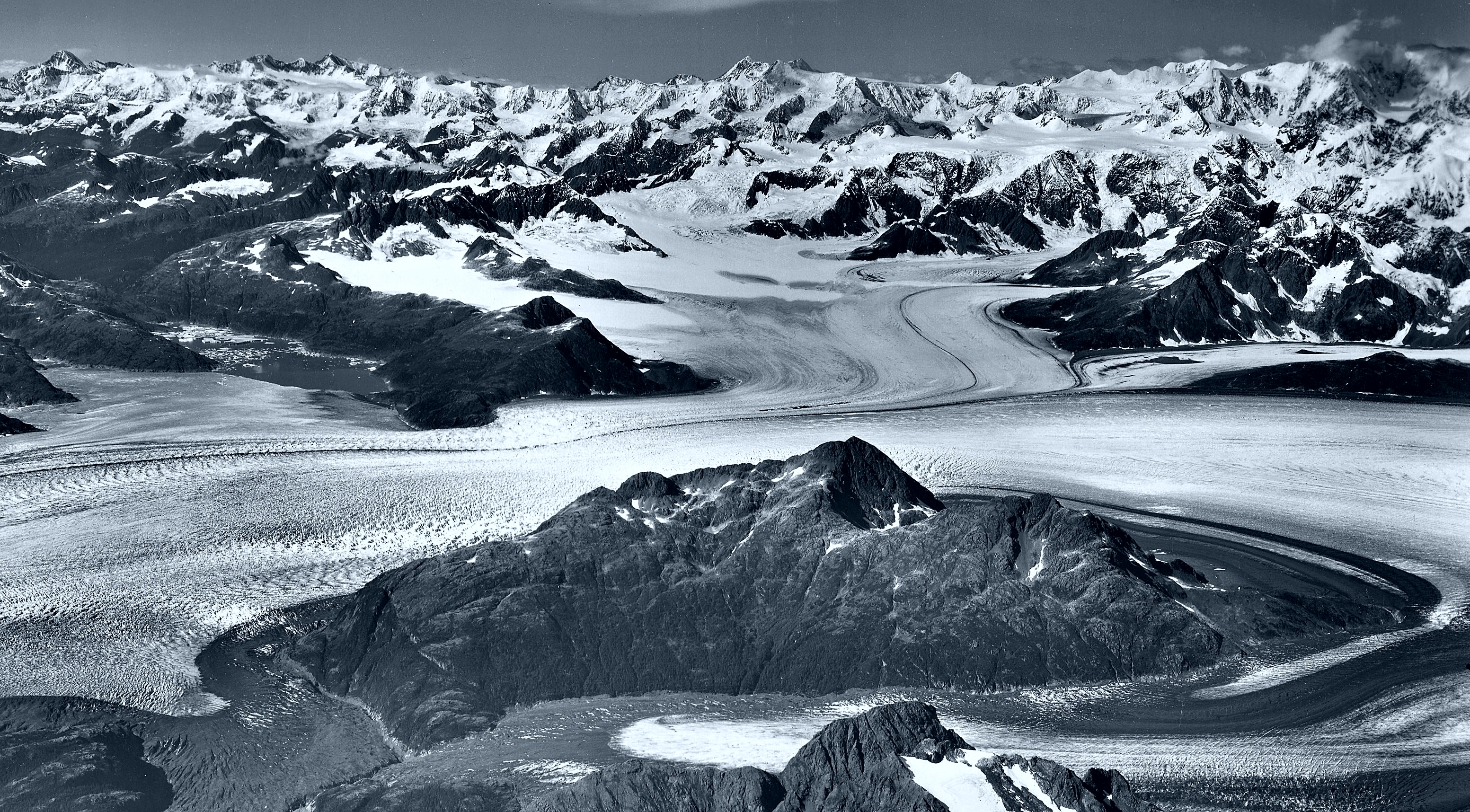
Great Nunatak in lower half of frame surrounded by Columbia Glacier in 1966

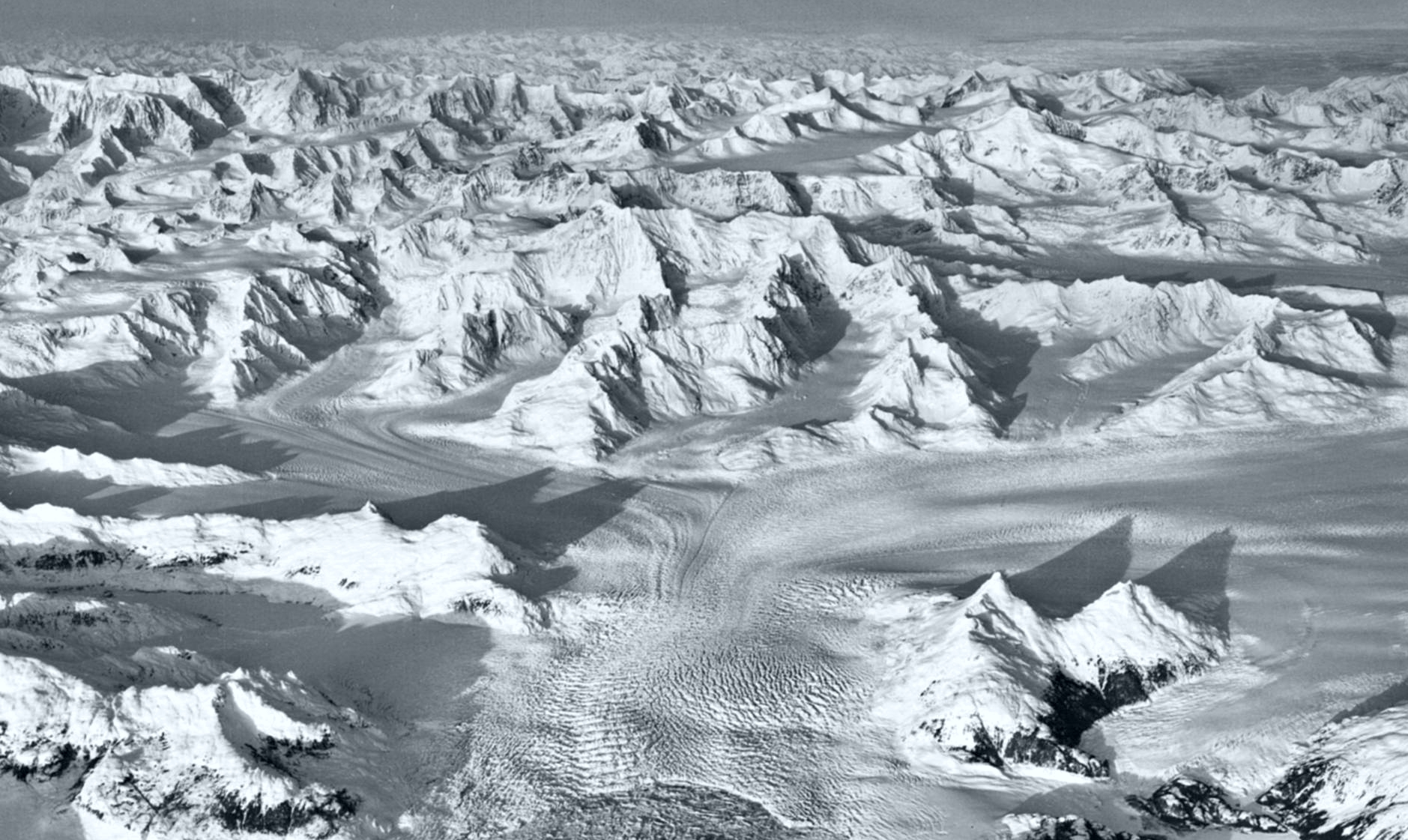
Great Nunatak in lower right corner, 1993. (Columbia Peak centered)

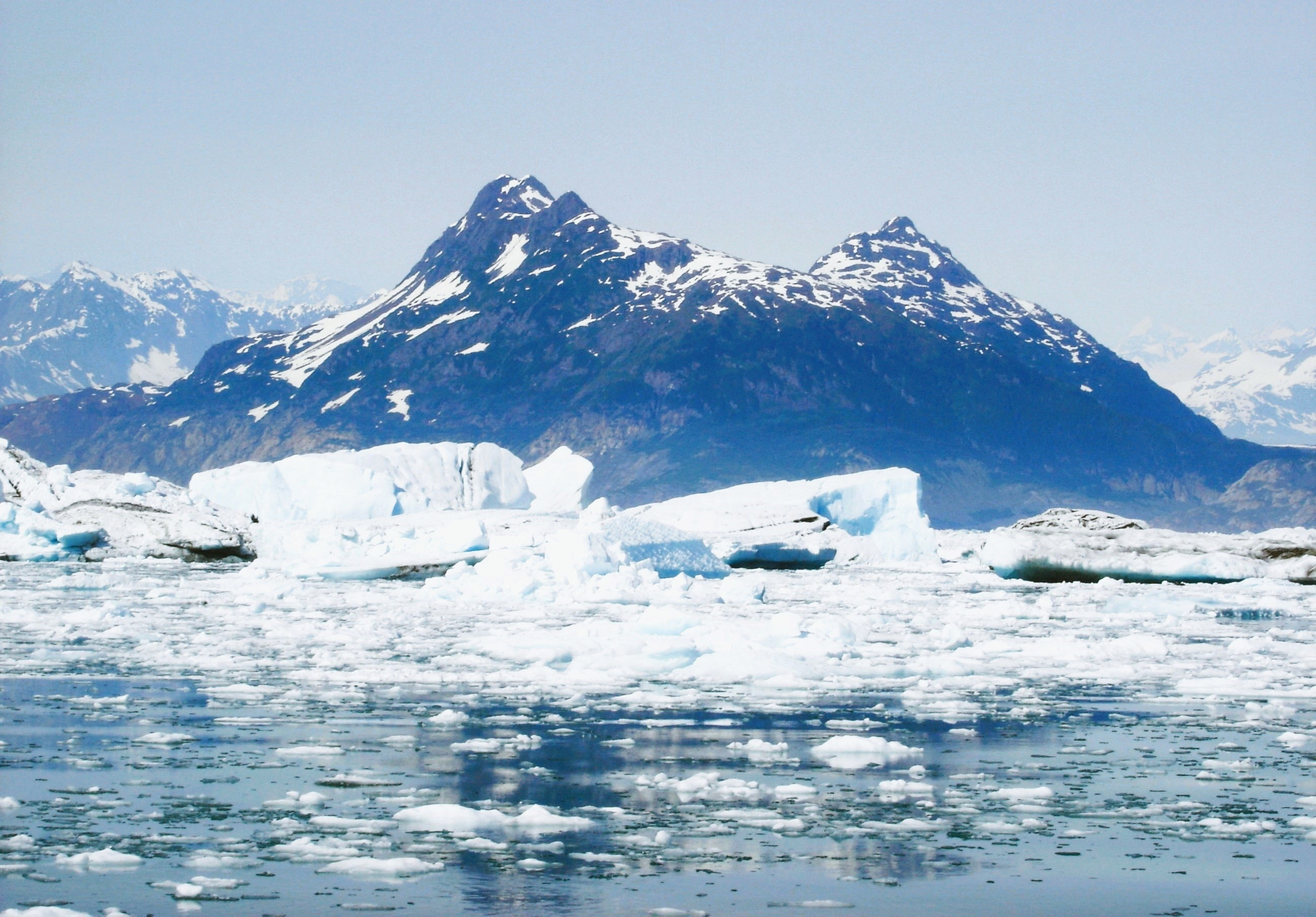
South aspect

== See also ==
- List of mountain peaks of Alaska
- Geography of Alaska
