= Stupendous Mountain =

Mountain in the country of Canada

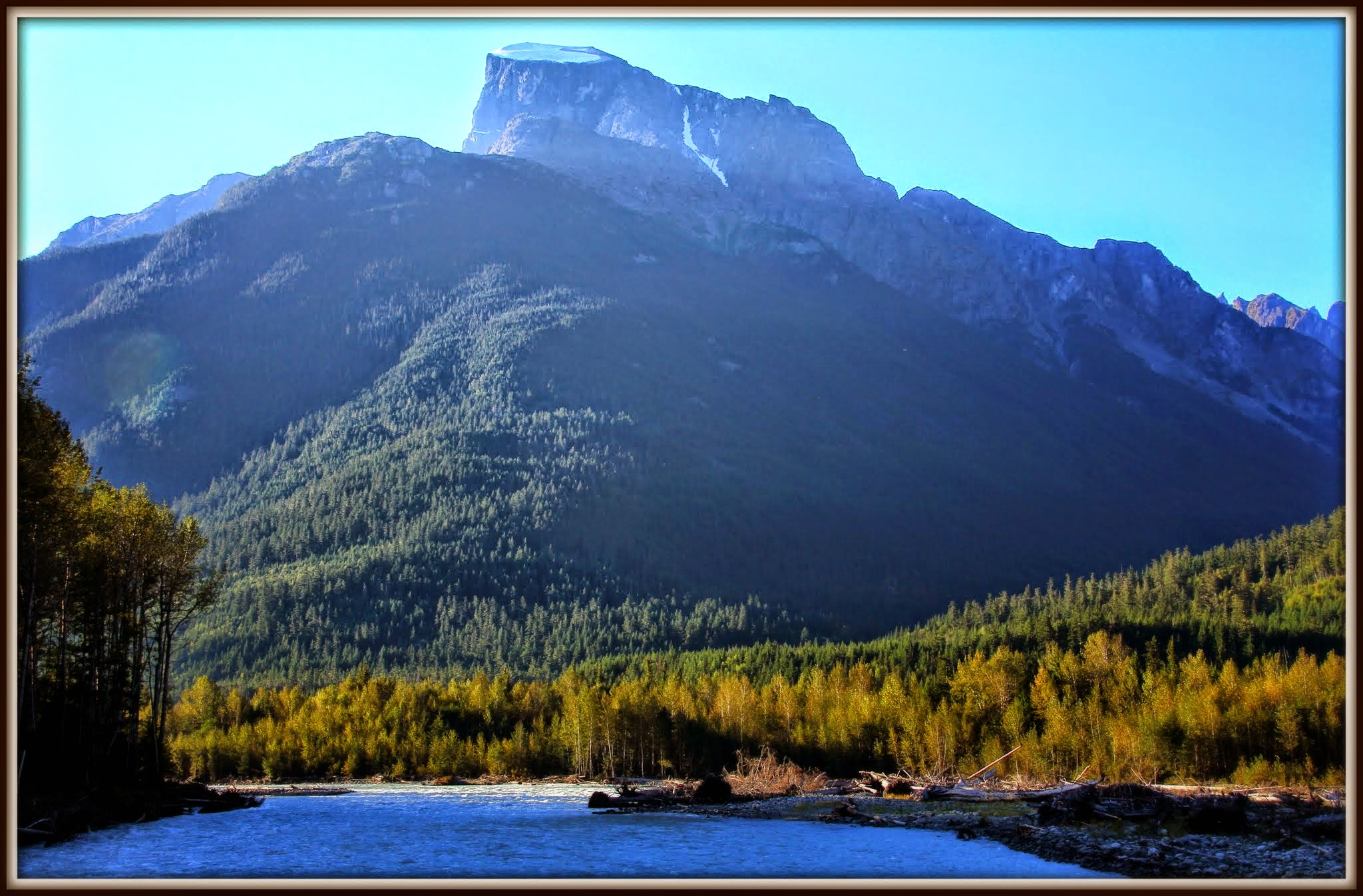
- Northwest aspect

Highest point
- Elevation: 2,682 m (8,799 ft)
- Prominence: 692 m (2,270 ft)
- Parent peak: The Horn (2,907 m)
- Isolation: 5.15 km (3.20 mi)
- Listing: Mountains of British Columbia
- Coordinates: 52°23′07″N 126°11′43″W

Naming
- Etymology: Stupendous

Geography
- Location within British Columbia Location within Canada
- Interactive map of Stupendous Mountain
- Country: Canada
- Province: British Columbia
- District: Range 3 Coast Land District
- Parent range: Coast Mountains
- Topo map: NTS 93D8 Stuie

Climbing
- First ascent: 1937

Stupendous Mountain is a 2,682-metre (8,799-foot) mountain summit located in British Columbia, Canada.

== Description ==
Stupendous Mountain, also known as Mount Stupendous, is situated in the Coast Mountains, towering above the south side of Bella Coola Valley. Stupendous is set 40 km (25 mi) east of Bella Coola and 430 km (270 mi) northwest of Vancouver. Precipitation runoff and glacier meltwater from the mountain drains into tributaries of the Bella Coola River. Topographic relief is significant as the summit rises 2,540 meters (8,333 feet) above the river in four kilometers (2.5 miles). The peak can be seen from Highway 20.

== History ==
Stupendous Mountain was described by Sir Alexander Mackenzie on 17 July 1793: "Before us appeared a stupendous mountain, whose snow-clad summit was lost in the clouds." A 1947 map confined the name Stupendous Mountain to the higher southern peak (2,697 m) on the massif; at the same time the northern peak was adopted as Table Mountain. The landform's toponym was officially adopted as "Stupendous Mountain" on November 1, 1979, by the Geographical Names Board of Canada and was shifted to the lower northern peak, while the name "Table Mountain" was rescinded. The mountain's Native American name is Chil-a-thlum-dinky.

The first ascent of the summit was made in 1937 by Don Munday, Phyllis Munday and their sixteen-year-old daughter, Edith.

== Climate ==
Based on the Köppen climate classification, Stupendous Mountain is located in the marine west coast climate zone of western North America. Most weather fronts originate in the Pacific Ocean, and travel east toward the Coast Mountains where they are forced upward by the range (Orographic lift), causing them to drop their moisture in the form of rain or snowfall. As a result, the Coast Mountains experience high precipitation, especially during the winter months in the form of snowfall. Winter temperatures can drop below −20 °C with wind chill factors below −30 °C. This climate supports a small glacier on the northeast slope.

== Gallery ==
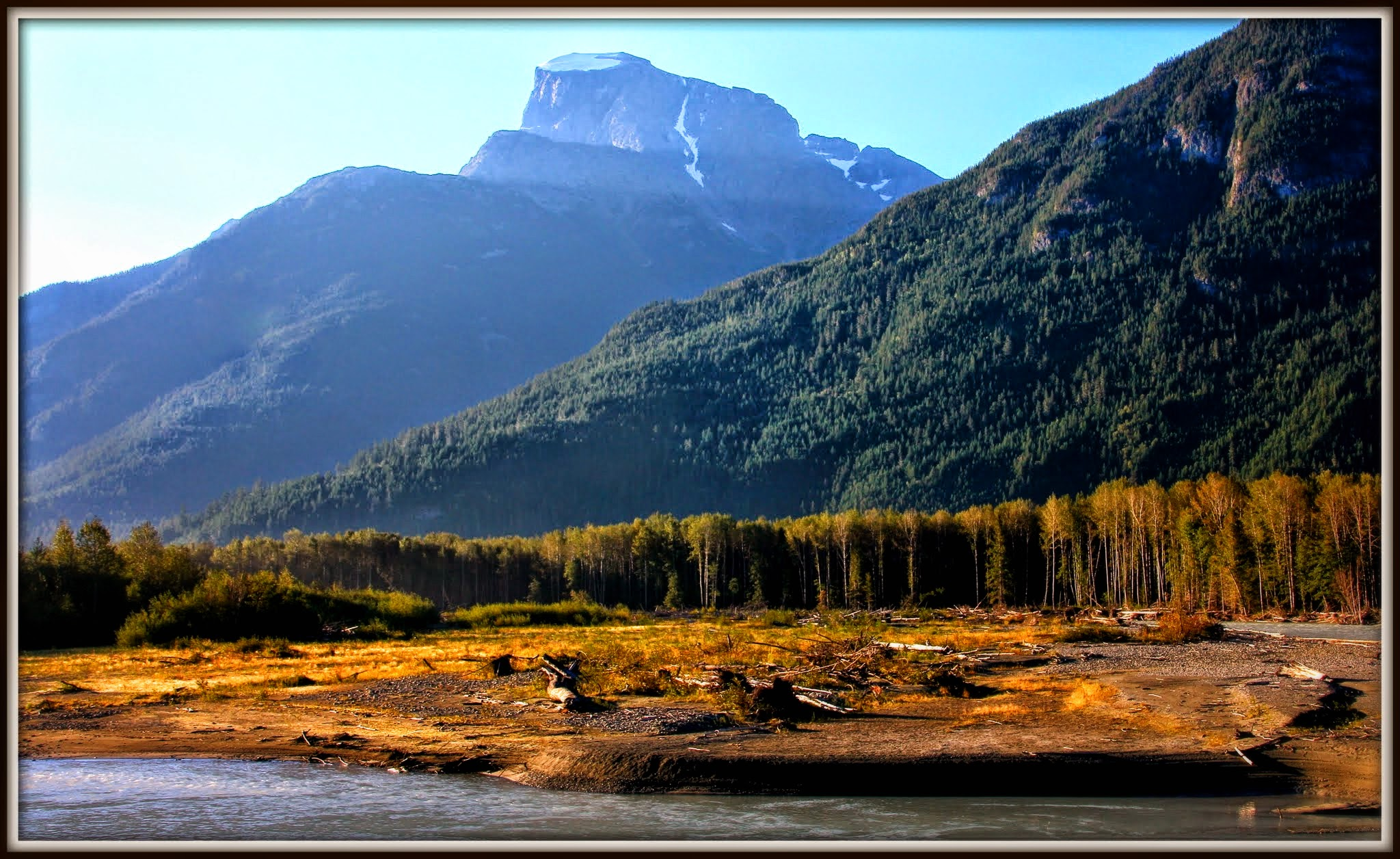
Northwest aspect

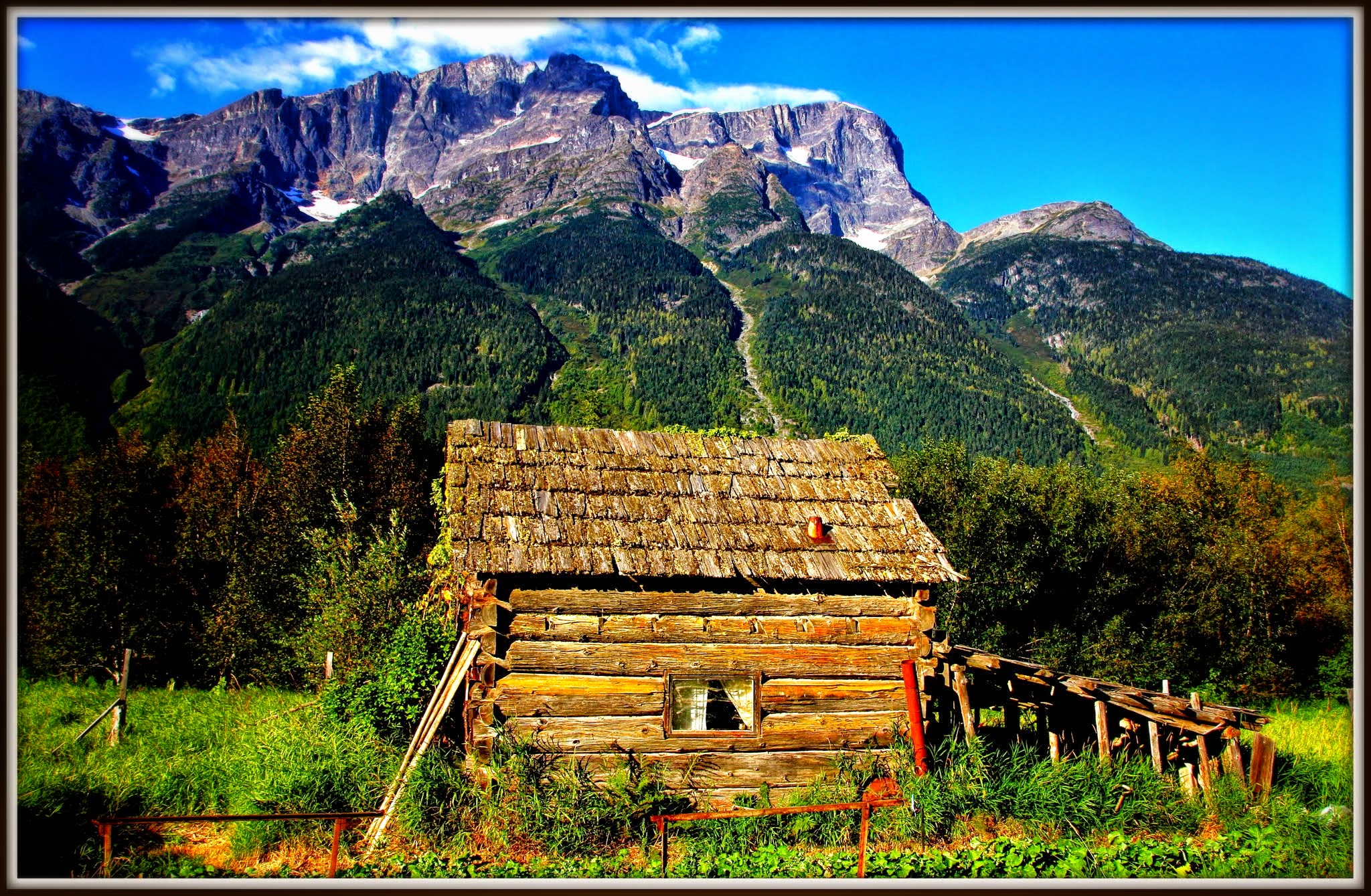
East aspect, with cabin in Bella Coola Valley

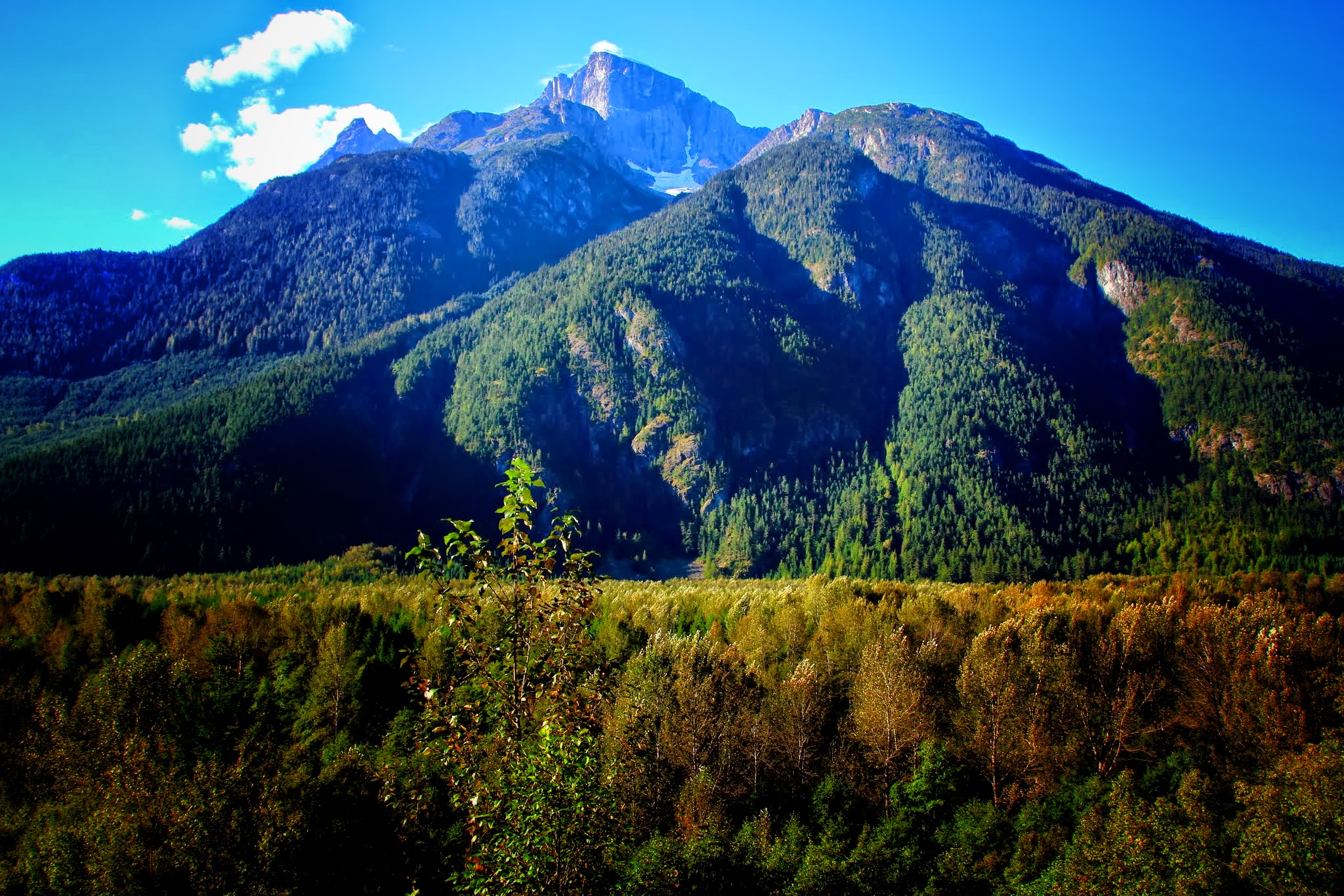
North aspect

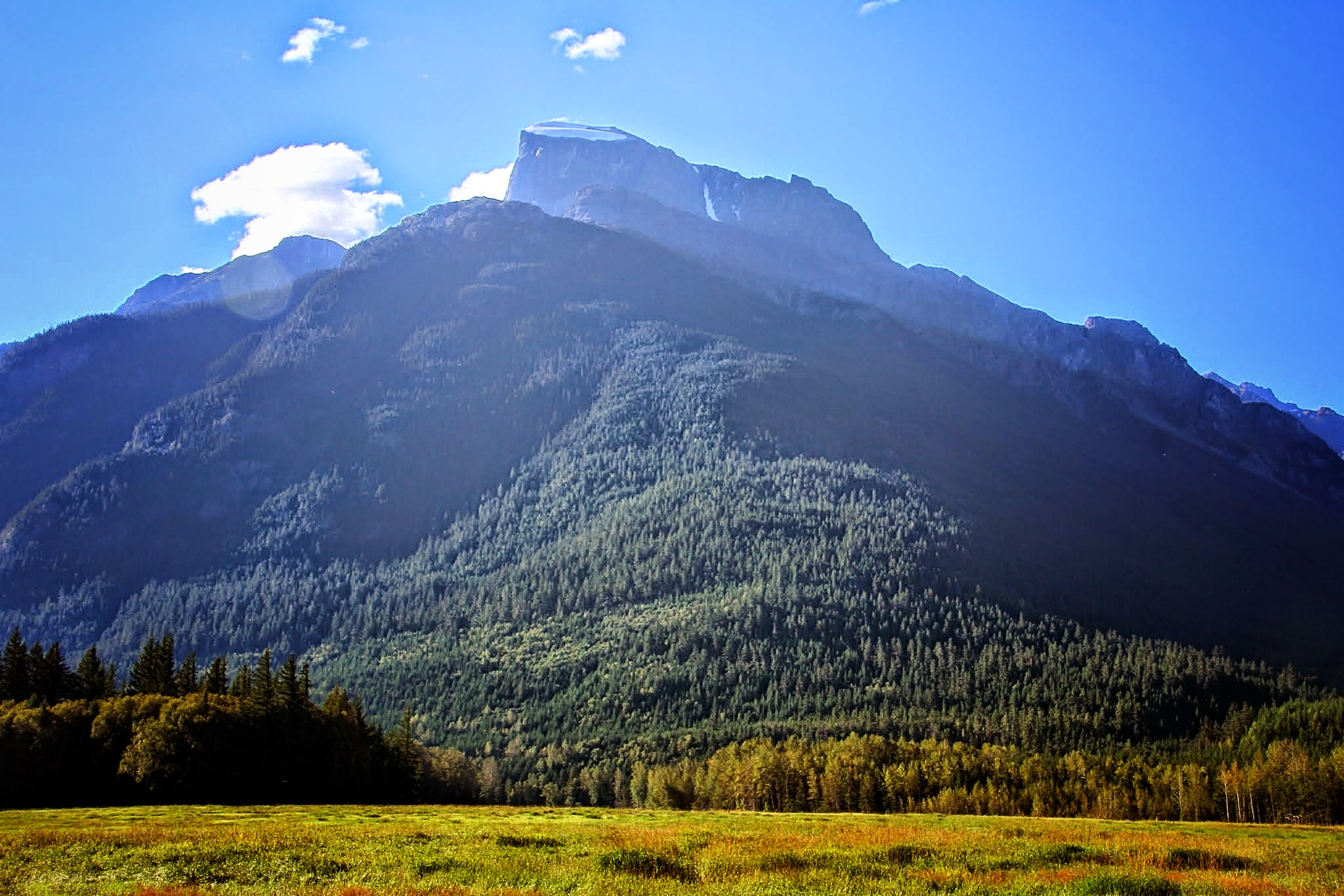

== See also ==
- Geography of British Columbia
