= Meares Glacier =

Glacier in Alaska

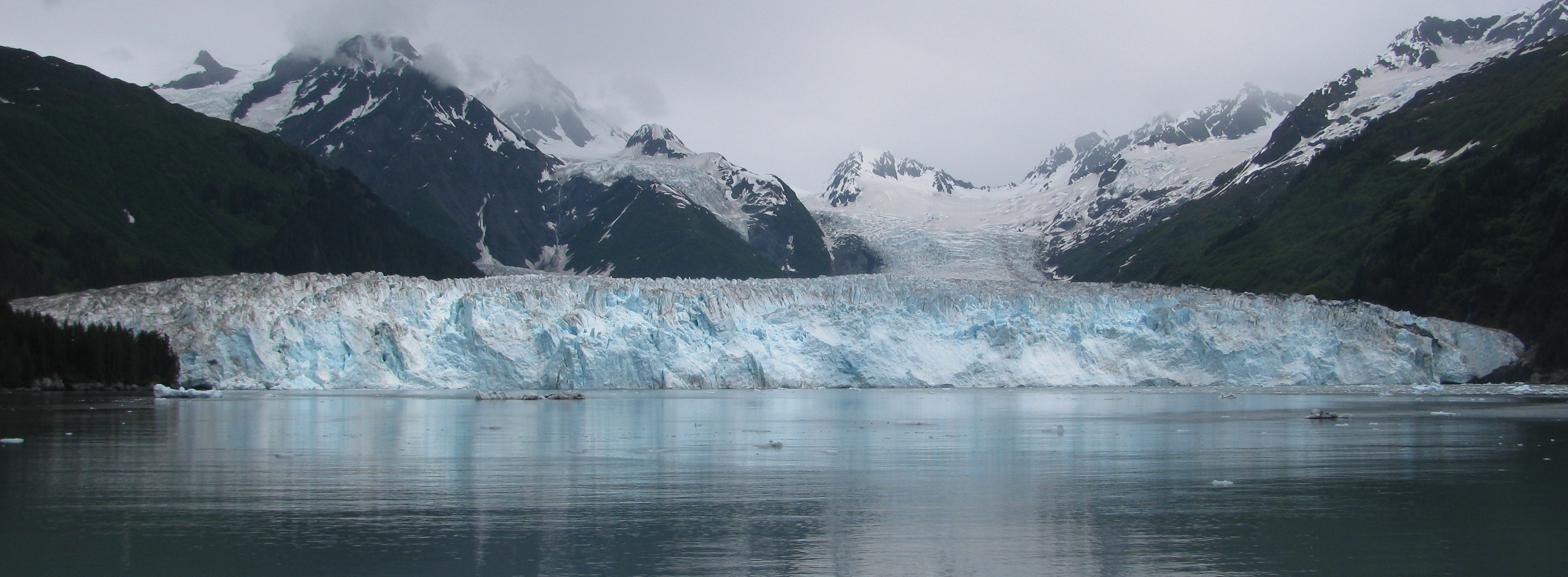

- Location within Alaska
- Interactive map of Meares Glacier
- Type: Tidewater glacier
- Location: Valdez-Cordova Census Area, Alaska, U.S.
- Coordinates: 61°14′23″N 147°25′03″W
- Area: 142 km^{2} (55 sq mi)(1990s)
- Length: 6 m (20 ft)
- Terminus: Ocean (Unakwik Inlet)
- Status: Advancing

The Meares Glacier is a large and only tidewater glacier at the head of Unakwik Inlet in Chugach National Forest, Alaska. The front is a wall of white ice with blue shadows (see image, right). It was first observed in 1905, and was named after an early explorer of the area, Captain John Meares. Writing in 1913, the U.S. Geographical Survey described the glacier as "one of the most beautiful ice streams of Prince William Sound." It is currently advancing into old-growth forest, slowly pushing down trees. Between 1996 and 2002, it advanced an average of 15 m per year. Its height at its front is estimated at 200 ft, and its width at about 1.2 km. In the early 1990s, the glacier had an estimated area of 142 km^{2}.

== See also ==
- List of glaciers
