= The Alaska Gold Rush =

1972 non-fiction book by David B. Wharton

- Author: David B. Wharton
- Publisher: Indiana University Press
- Publication date: 1972
- Pages: 320
- ISBN: 978-0-253-10061-0
- OCLC: 533664

The Alaska Gold Rush is a 1972 non-fiction book by David B. Wharton about the Nome and Fairbanks gold rushes. It was published by Indiana University Press.

== Background ==
Before writing The Alaska Gold Rush, Wharton had previous worked as a newsman, diplomat, college professor, lawyer, and lecturer. He had written three other books.

== Reception ==
A review by Rodman W. Paul in Pacific Historical Review called the book "colorful and wellwritten" piece, praising Wharton's writing and saying also that his research "would have won the warm approval of Francis Parkman or Samuel Elliot Morrison". He compared it favorably to Klondike Fever by Pierre Burton, calling it "more persuasive". However, Paul also criticised the structure and flow of the book, and he felt that the stories and anecdotes it contained were not well-connected to each other.

A review in the Mansfield News Journal said that Wharton had "given flavor to his research on individual adventures", noting his use of personal interviews and the way Wharton had consulted private letters and diaries to explore the subject. A review in Colorado Prospector was described the book as "colorful and authentic". The Dillon Daily Tribune Examiner's review compared the book favorably to other history books, saying that Wharton's writing was "recreating life as it was lived" rather than simply looking at statistics and dates. Reviews in The Post-Star and the Oakland Tribune had similar analyses. The Oakland Tribune review also noted Wharton's claim that the Alaska Gold Rushes, as well as the earlier Klondike Gold Rush, were the "end of an era of independent individualism".

In a 1992 review of Wharton's later book, They Don't Speak Russian in Sitka, Jo McMeen of the Huntingdon Daily News described it as much less "stimulating" telling of Alaskan history than The Alaska Gold Rush.

The Alaska Gold Rush was reviewed by Jim B. Pearson in History: Reviews of New Books.
