= Chugach National Forest =

National Forest in Alaska, United States

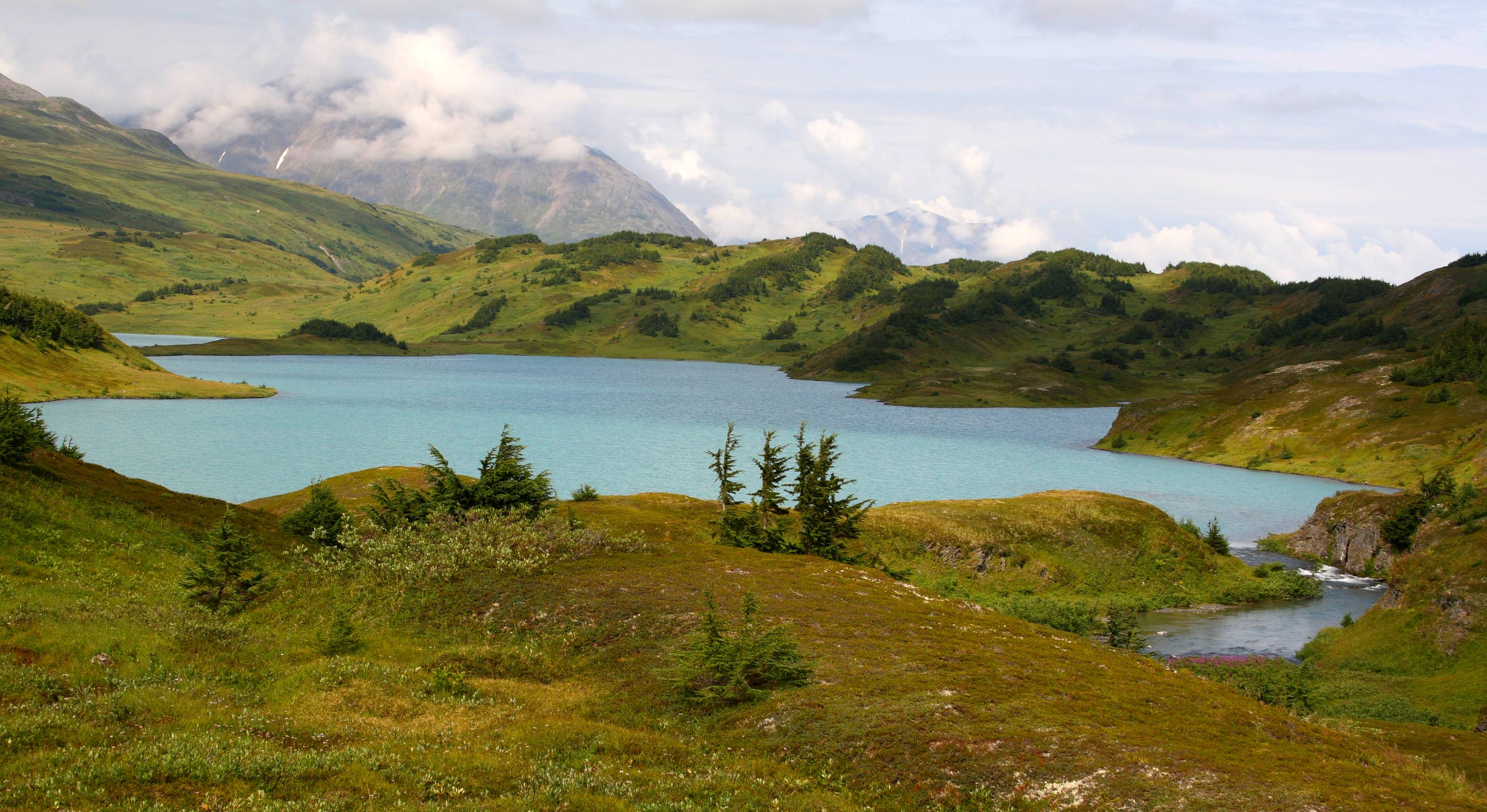
- Lost Lake in Chugach National Forest

- Location within Alaska
- Location: Alaska, United States
- Nearest city: Anchorage, Alaska
- Coordinates: 60.4614912°N 149.1259814°W
- Area: 6,908,540 acres (27,957.9 km^{2})
- Established: July 23, 1907
- Governing body: U.S. Forest Service
- Website: Chugach National Forest

The Chugach National Forest is a 6,908,540-acre (27,958 km^{2}) United States National Forest in south central Alaska. Covering portions of Prince William Sound, the Kenai Peninsula and the Copper River Delta, it was formed in 1907 from part of a larger forest reserve. The Chugach includes extensive shorelines, glaciers, forests and rivers, much of which is untouched by roads or trails. It hosts numerous bird, mammal and marine species, including extensive shorebird habitat and a bald eagle population larger than the contiguous 48 states combined. Human industry in the forest includes extensive tourism and some mining and oil and gas operations.

== History ==
The area that is now Chugach was settled by the Alutiiq thousands of years ago. It was first visited by Europeans in the mid-1700s and soon settled by Russian fur traders, who trapped the native sea otters. In 1867, the US purchased Alaska from Russia and gold was found in 1888. In 1907, the Chugach National Forest was created from a portion of forest reserve, which had been one of the first of its kind, designated in 1892.

== Geography ==
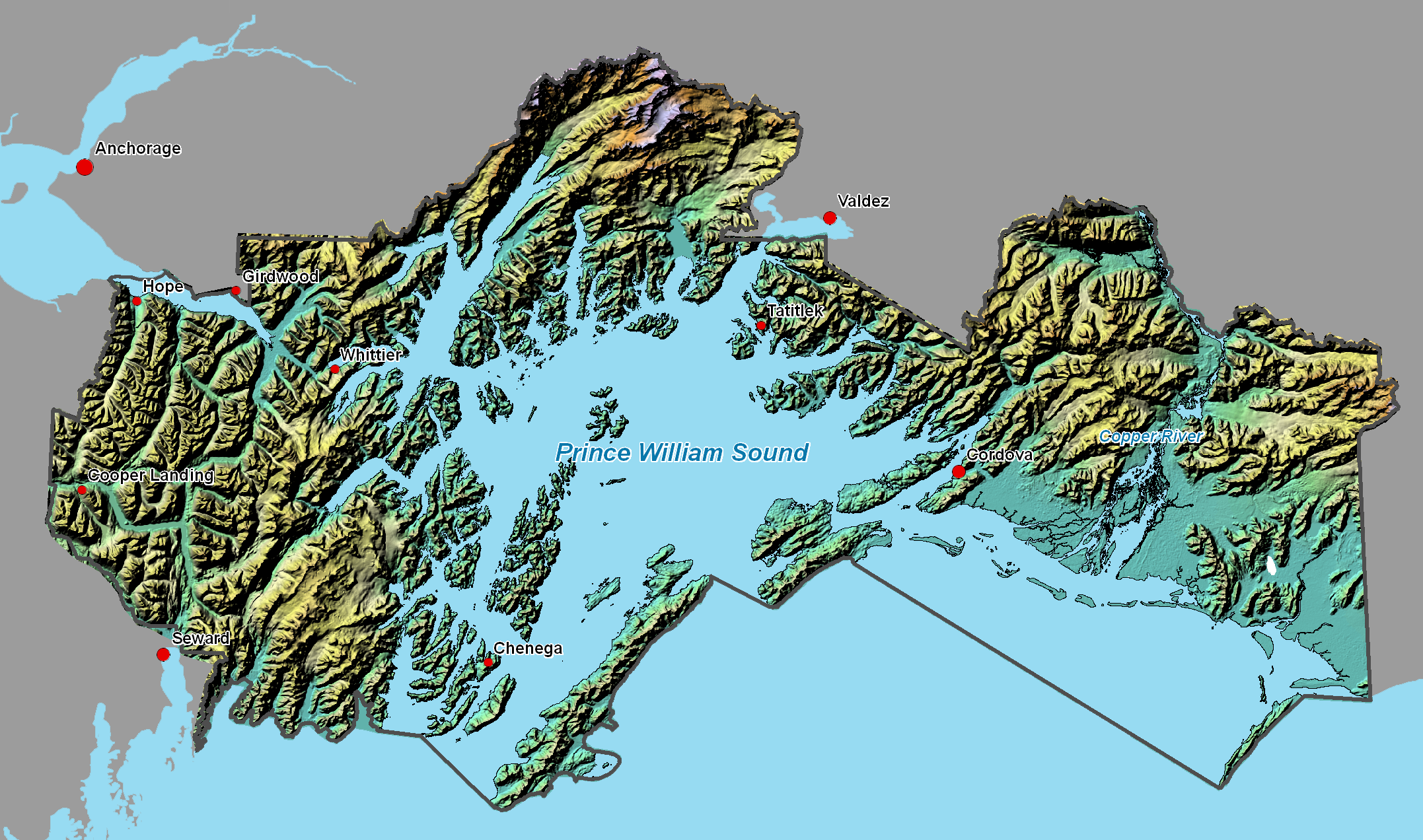
The Chugach National Forest surrounds Prince William Sound and is very mountainous.

It is located in the mountains surrounding Prince William Sound including the eastern Kenai Peninsula and the delta of the Copper River. It is the second-largest (third-largest if the Humboldt-Toiyabe National Forest is considered as one entity) forest in the U.S. national forest system, and is the northernmost and westernmost national forest. Approximately 30 percent of the area of the forest is covered by ice. Portions of the Kenai Peninsula make up approximately 21 percent of the forest, and include the southern portion of the Iditarod National Historic Trail. Parts of Prince William Sound make up about 48 percent of the forest. This includes 3,500 mi (5,600 km) of shoreline, 22 tidewater glaciers, and the Nellie Juan-College Fiord Wilderness Study Area, which covers 2,200,000 acres (8,900 km^{2}). Portions of the Copper River Delta cover approximately 31 percent of the forest, and include the "largest contiguous wetlands complex on North America's Pacific coast". Despite its huge size, there are only 90 mi (140 km) of Forest Service roads, although there are also over 500 mi (800 km) of designated trails.

The supervisor's office is located in Anchorage. There are local ranger district offices located in Cordova, Girdwood, and Seward.

In descending order of land area within the forest, it is located in parts of the Valdez-Cordova Census Area, Kenai Peninsula Borough, Anchorage Municipality, Matanuska-Susitna Borough, Kodiak Island Borough, and Yakutat City and Borough.

=== Islands ===
Green Island is within the Chugach National Forest north of Montague Island in Prince William Sound, Alaska. There are at least three islands named "Green Island" within Alaska.

Gravina Island is also in the Chugach.

=== Climate ===
According to the Köppen climate classification system, Chugach National Forest has a subarctic climate (Köppen Dfc). Cannery Creek is a weather station in the Chugach National Forest, located along the shore of the Unakwik Inlet.

Climate data for Cannery Creek, Alaska, 1991–2020 normals, extremes 1979–present
Month	Jan	Feb	Mar	Apr	May	Jun	Jul	Aug	Sep	Oct	Nov	Dec	Year
Record high °F (°C)	46 (8)	43 (6)	52 (11)	64 (18)	71 (22)	83 (28)	83 (28)	81 (27)	69 (21)	58 (14)	48 (9)	45 (7)	83 (28)
Mean maximum °F (°C)	37.6 (3.1)	37.9 (3.3)	43.4 (6.3)	53.6 (12.0)	65.1 (18.4)	72.6 (22.6)	73.6 (23.1)	71.6 (22.0)	62.0 (16.7)	51.4 (10.8)	41.3 (5.2)	39.4 (4.1)	75.7 (24.3)
Mean daily maximum °F (°C)	28.7 (−1.8)	31.8 (−0.1)	36.3 (2.4)	44.0 (6.7)	53.0 (11.7)	60.4 (15.8)	62.2 (16.8)	61.0 (16.1)	53.6 (12.0)	43.7 (6.5)	33.7 (0.9)	30.8 (−0.7)	44.9 (7.2)
Daily mean °F (°C)	24.3 (−4.3)	26.6 (−3.0)	29.2 (−1.6)	36.5 (2.5)	44.2 (6.8)	52.2 (11.2)	55.4 (13.0)	54.2 (12.3)	47.7 (8.7)	38.9 (3.8)	29.8 (−1.2)	26.9 (−2.8)	38.8 (3.8)
Mean daily minimum °F (°C)	19.9 (−6.7)	21.4 (−5.9)	22.1 (−5.5)	29.0 (−1.7)	35.4 (1.9)	44.1 (6.7)	48.6 (9.2)	47.4 (8.6)	41.8 (5.4)	34.0 (1.1)	25.9 (−3.4)	23.0 (−5.0)	32.7 (0.4)
Mean minimum °F (°C)	3.3 (−15.9)	5.4 (−14.8)	6.4 (−14.2)	18.1 (−7.7)	28.7 (−1.8)	36.5 (2.5)	43.4 (6.3)	40.5 (4.7)	31.8 (−0.1)	23.6 (−4.7)	12.7 (−10.7)	7.0 (−13.9)	−1.1 (−18.4)
Record low °F (°C)	−18 (−28)	−11 (−24)	−4 (−20)	1 (−17)	23 (−5)	29 (−2)	35 (2)	31 (−1)	23 (−5)	10 (−12)	−8 (−22)	−12 (−24)	−18 (−28)
Average precipitation inches (mm)	10.21 (259)	9.71 (247)	6.81 (173)	6.26 (159)	7.03 (179)	5.60 (142)	7.08 (180)	13.81 (351)	17.23 (438)	14.88 (378)	11.20 (284)	12.13 (308)	121.95 (3,098)
Average snowfall inches (cm)	33.2 (84)	27.7 (70)	25.3 (64)	6.3 (16)	0.1 (0.25)	0.0 (0.0)	0.0 (0.0)	0.0 (0.0)	0.0 (0.0)	2.3 (5.8)	19.3 (49)	37.2 (94)	151.4 (383.05)
Average extreme snow depth inches (cm)	39.9 (101)	48.3 (123)	56.3 (143)	51.2 (130)	27.1 (69)	2.0 (5.1)	0.0 (0.0)	0.0 (0.0)	0.0 (0.0)	2.0 (5.1)	12.2 (31)	28.7 (73)	58.9 (150)
Average precipitation days (≥ 0.01 in)	17.8	16.3	15.6	15.6	17.1	16.1	18.6	19.2	21.6	21.3	17.3	20.0	216.5
Average snowy days (≥ 0.1 in)	11.1	10.5	9.1	2.4	0.2	0.0	0.0	0.0	0.0	1.2	7.1	12.2	53.8
Source 1: NOAA
Source 2: National Weather Service

== Ecology ==
The Chugach is a temperate rain forest in the Pacific temperate rain forest region. Here the forest occupies only a very narrow strip between the ocean and the icy alpine zone. The dominant trees are limited to Sitka spruce, western hemlock and mountain hemlock. This zone is known as the "sub-polar rainforest".

The Kenai Peninsula section of the forest is home to over 200 colonies of seabirds, as well as between 3,000 and 5,000 bald eagles. Approximately the same number of eagles live in the Chugach National Forest as live in the entire contiguous United States. The Copper River Delta portion of the forest is the largest contiguous portion of the Western Hemisphere Shorebird Reserve Network and is "considered one of the most essential shorebird habitats in the world". The Delta provides habitat for over 20 million birds annually, and during the summer, one quarter of the world's trumpeter swans and dusky Canada geese call the Delta home. Mammals that inhabit this forest include coyote, grey wolf, moose, caribou, marten, Sitka black-tailed deer, mountain goat, black bears and grizzly bears. Dall sheep are also found; the Chugach is the only national forest where these animals can be seen. Humpback whales, sea lions and otters are found in the Chugach's waters. The waters around the forest also host all five species of Pacific salmon found in North America: chinook salmon, sockeye salmon, coho salmon, chum salmon and pink salmon.

== Human impacts ==
There is very little logging done in the Chugach, and less than 2 percent of the forest is considered suitable for commercial logging operations; this is unusual among national forests. Instead, the forest infuses money into local communities through tourism, recreation, mining and commercial fishing. There are over 7 million annual visitors to the Chugach National Forest, including kayakers, boaters, hikers, skiers, birders and anglers. None of the area is designated as national wilderness, although much of it qualifies under federal law. Mining, including coal and hard rock operations, and oil and gas development are found in the forest. In 2003, the Department of the Interior announced that 3,000 acres (12 km^{2}) of forest was no longer open to mining, adding that area to almost 2,000 acres (8.1 km^{2}) that had been previously placed off limits. The affected land borders the Kenai National Wildlife Refuge Wilderness, and the department cited protecting the Russian River and upper Russian Lake Recreation Corridor as the reason for the change.

== Gallery ==
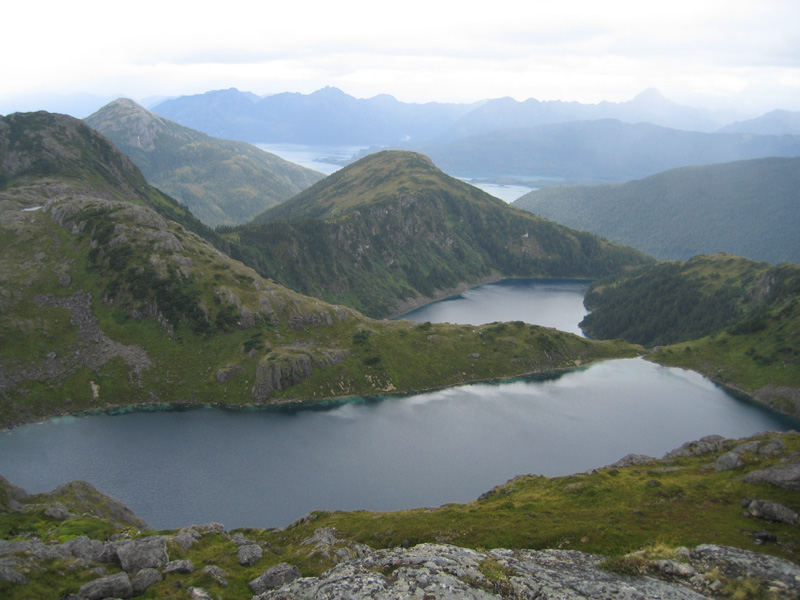
Alpine Lakes in the Chugach forest

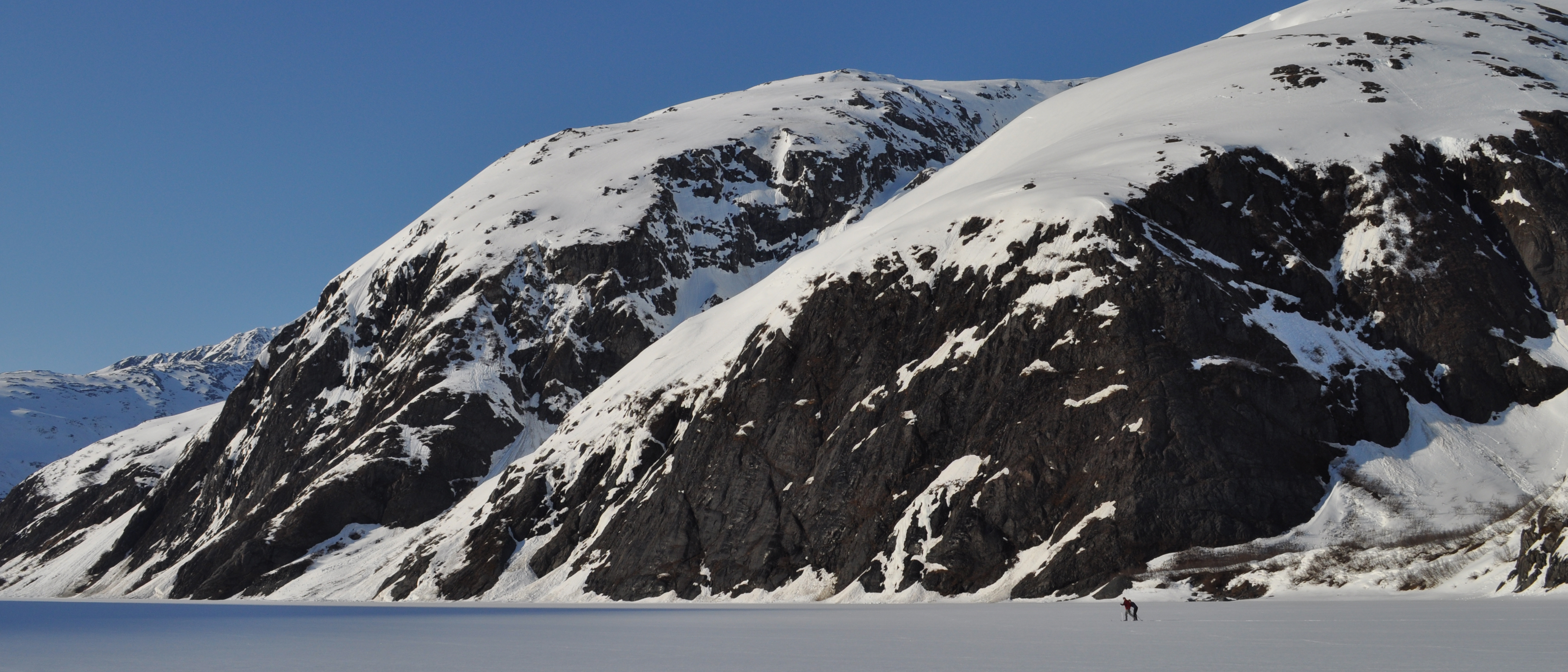
Skiers cross Portage Lake

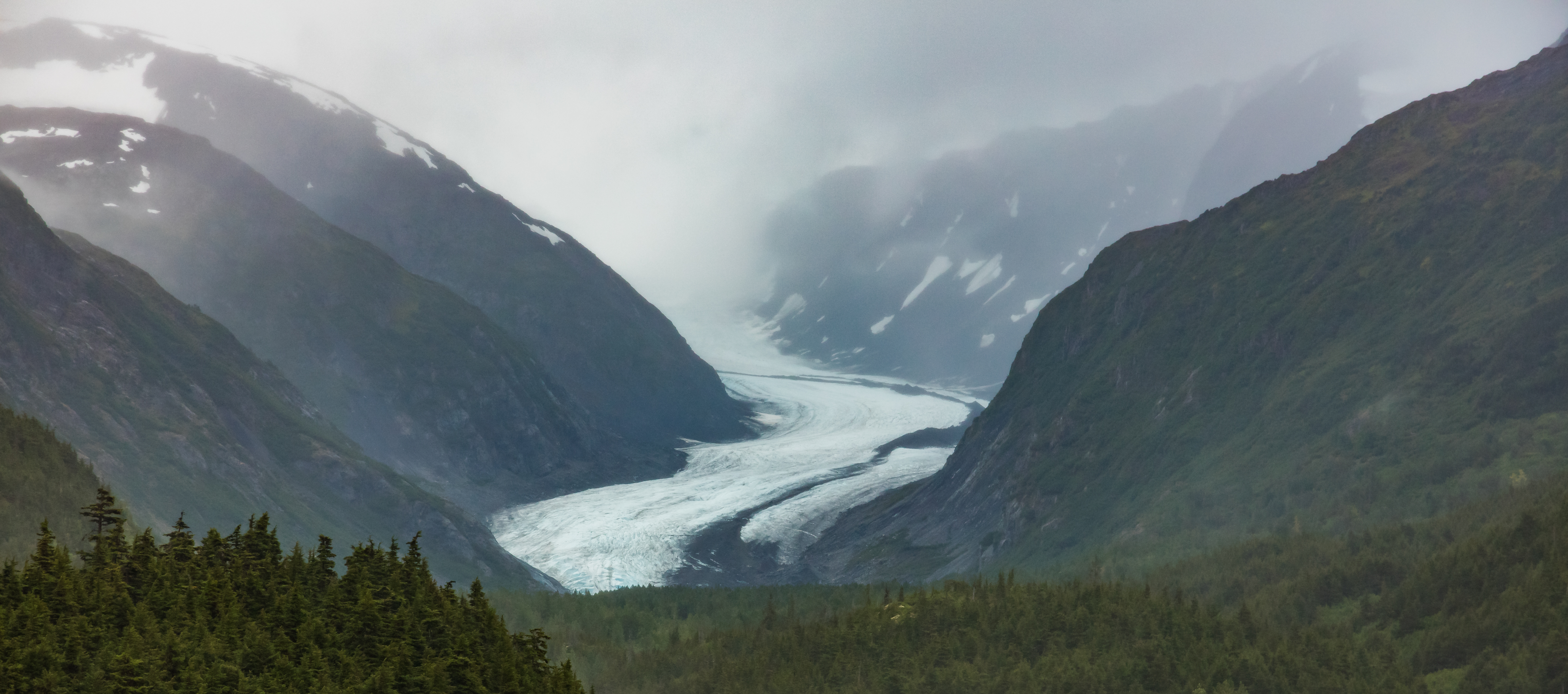
Spencer Glacier, in the Chugach Forest

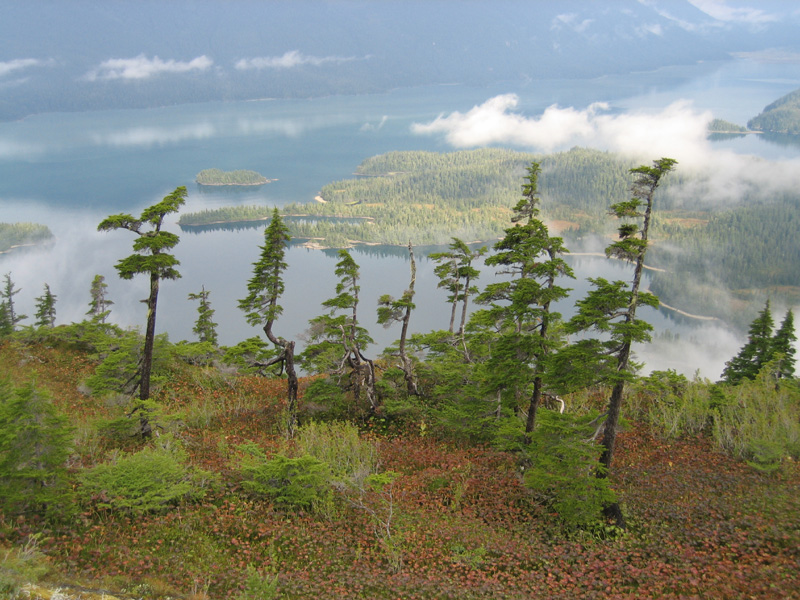
Alpine trees in the Chugach forest

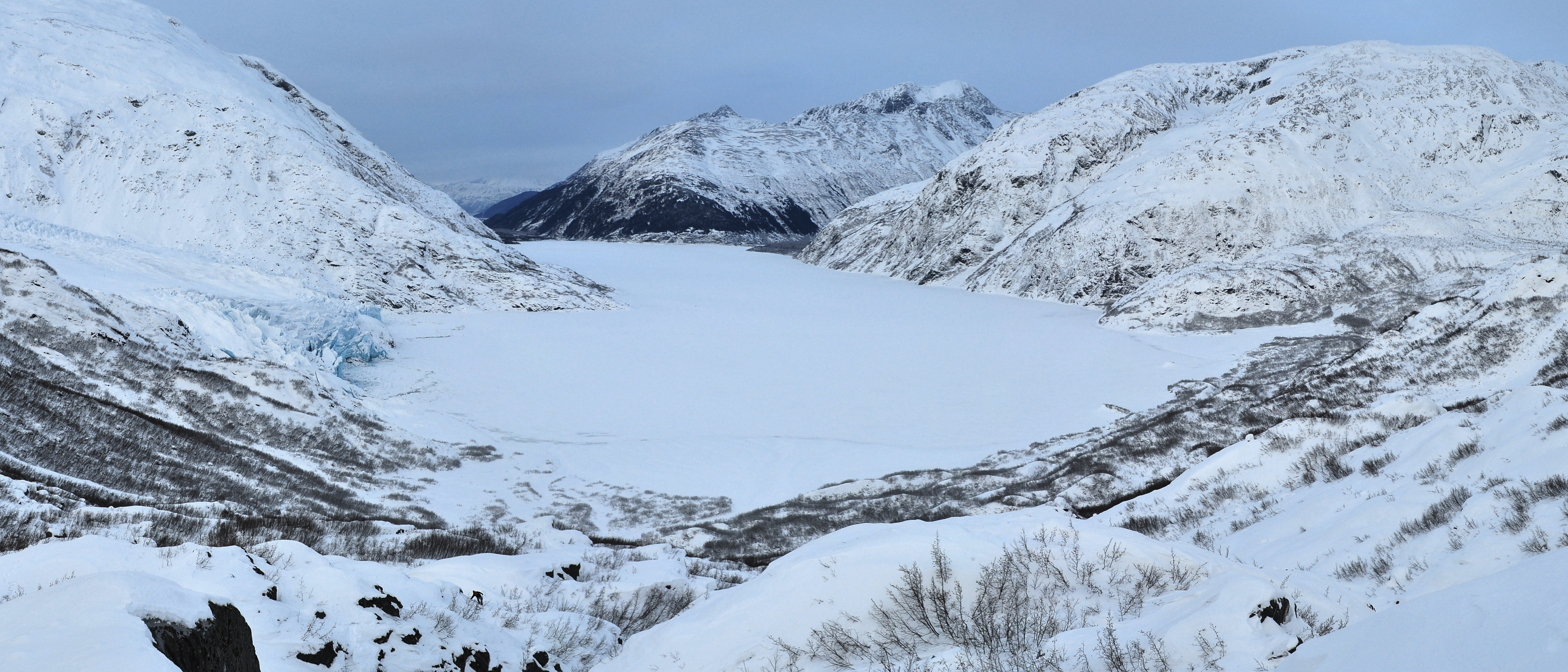
Portage Lake in winter

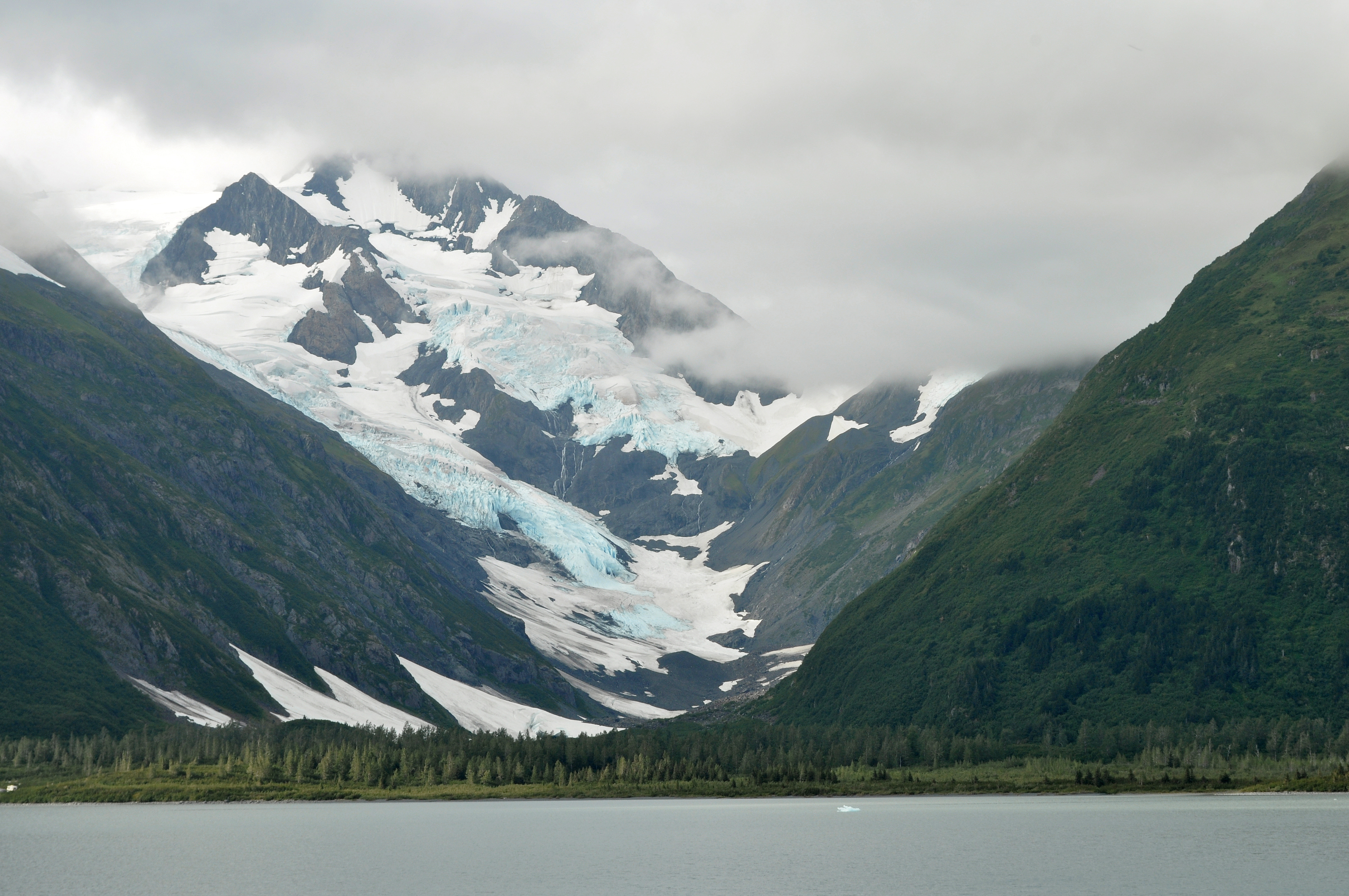
Byron Peak

== See also ==
- List of national forests of the United States
- Tongass National Forest
