= Mount Edison =

Mountain in Alaska, United States

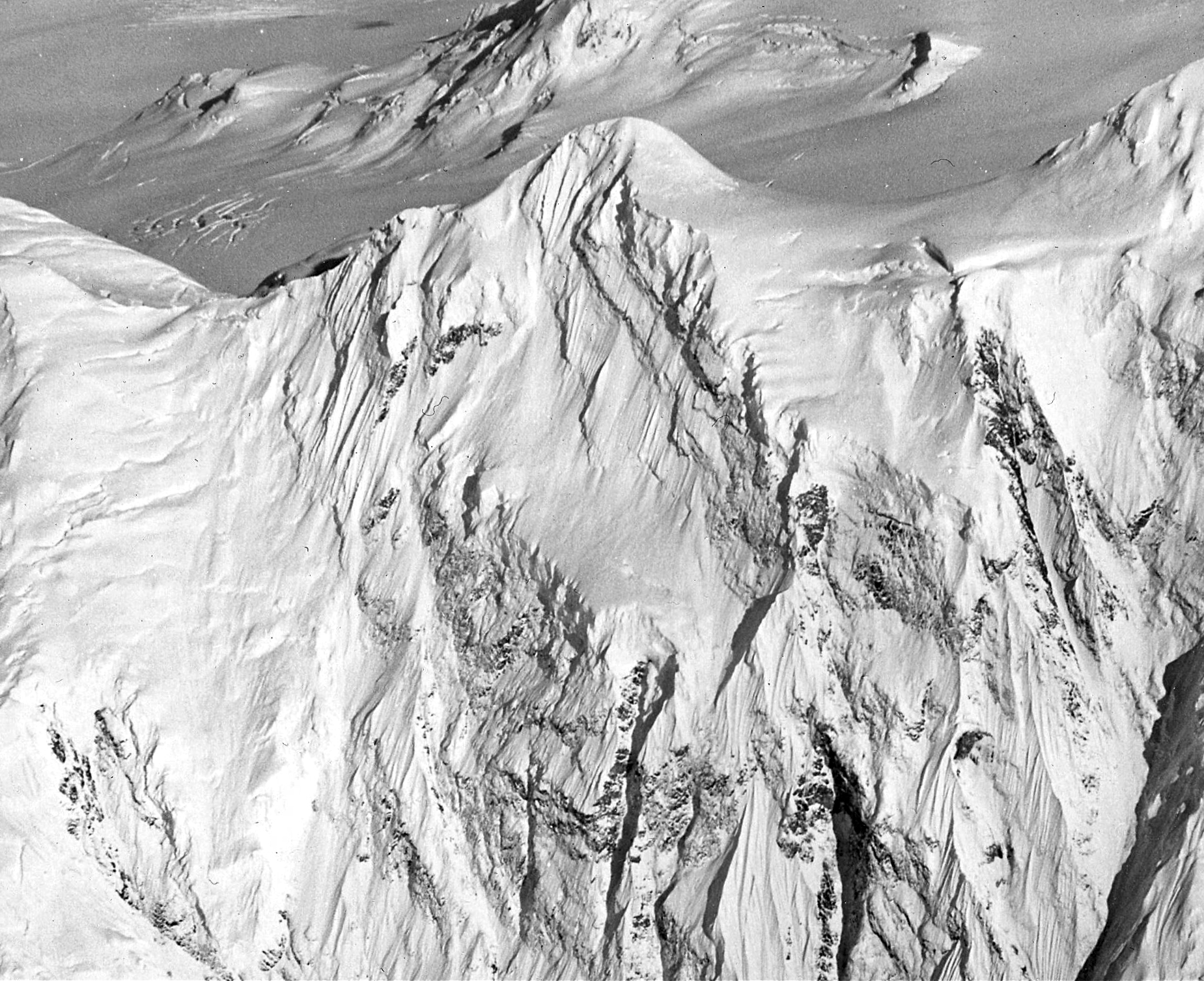
- Aerial view from northwest

Highest point
- Elevation: 11,450 ft (3,490 m)
- Prominence: 400 ft (120 m)
- Parent peak: Mount Witherspoon (12,012 ft)
- Isolation: 0.79 mi (1.27 km)
- Coordinates: 61°24′23″N 147°11′27″W

Geography
- Location within Alaska
- Interactive map of Mount Edison
- Location: Chugach National Forest; Copper River Census Area; Alaska, United States
- Parent range: Chugach Mountains
- Topo map: USGS Anchorage B-1

Mount Edison is an 11,450-foot (3,490 m) elevation glaciated summit located 36 mi (58 km) northwest of Valdez in the Chugach Mountains of the U.S. state of Alaska. Set on land managed by Chugach National Forest, this remote peak is situated 4.7 mi (8 km) northwest of Mount Einstein, near the head Columbia Glacier. It is part of the Dora Keen Range, which is a 25-miles-long divide separating Harvard Glacier from Yale Glacier. The mountain was named by members of the Chugach Mountains Expedition in 1955, and later officially adopted by the U.S. Board on Geographic Names to honor Thomas Edison (1847–1931), who has been described as America's greatest inventor.

== Climate ==
Based on the Köppen climate classification, Mount Edison is located in a subarctic climate zone with long, cold, snowy winters, and cool summers. Weather systems coming off the Gulf of Alaska are forced upwards by the Chugach Mountains (orographic lift), causing heavy precipitation in the form of rainfall and snowfall. Temperatures can drop below −20 °C with wind chill factors below −30 °C. This climate supports the Harvard, Yale, and Columbia Glaciers surrounding this mountain. The months May through June offer the most favorable weather for climbing.

== Gallery ==
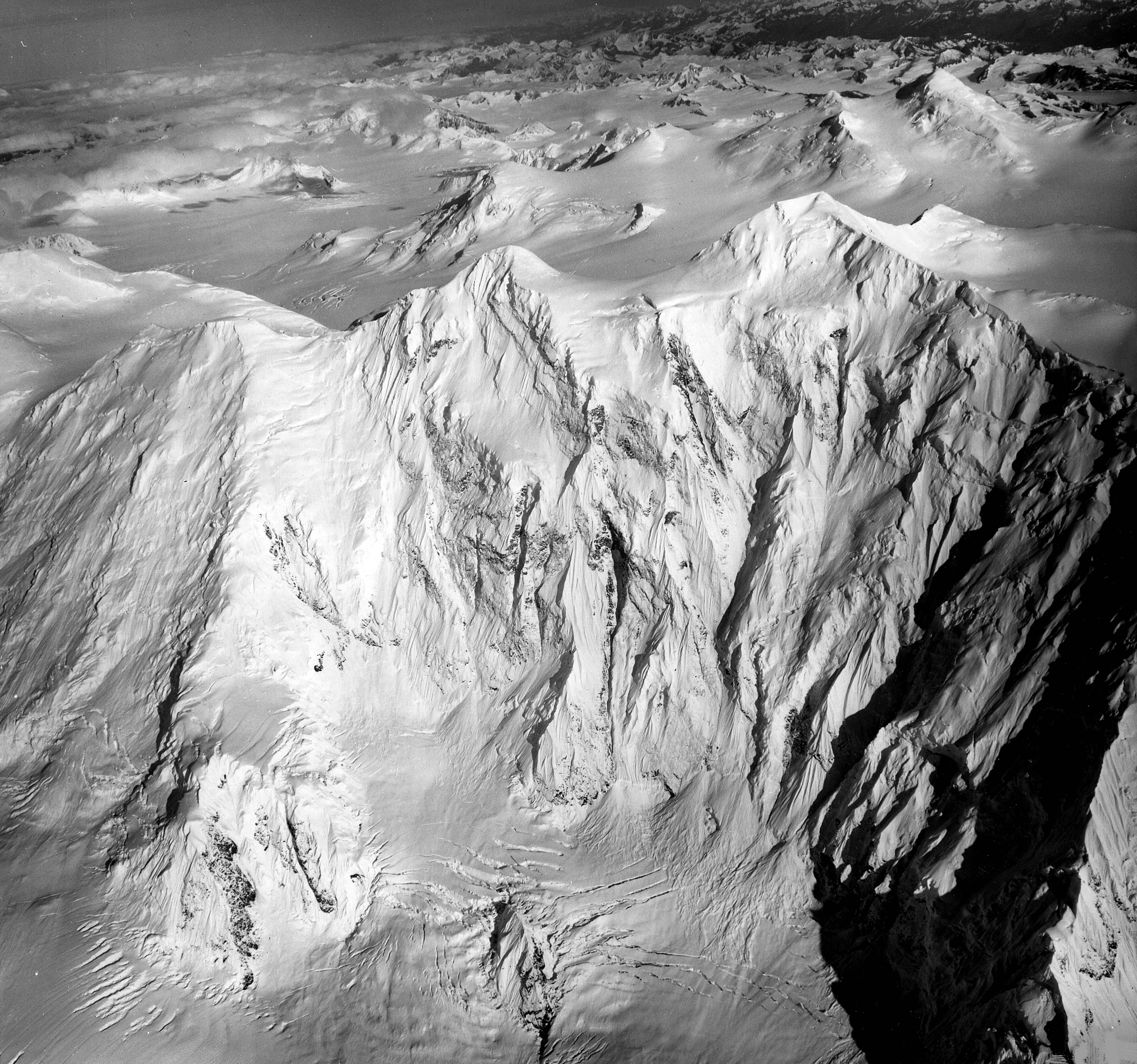
Mts. Edison and Witherspoon, with Einstein upper right corner

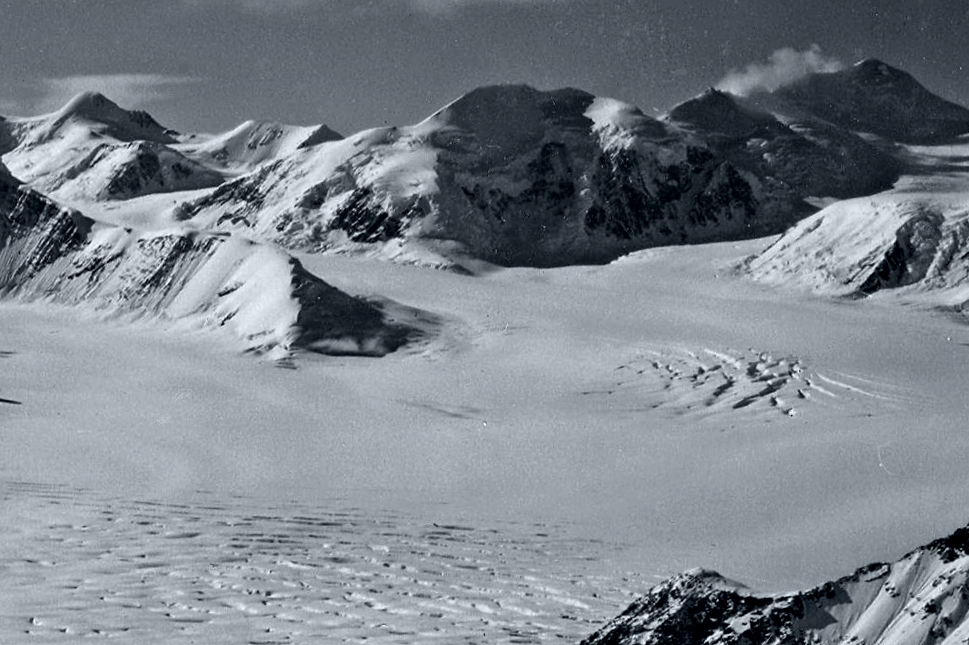
Aerial view looking west with Mt. Elusive centered, Mt. Edison upper left, and Mt. Gilbert Lewis in upper right

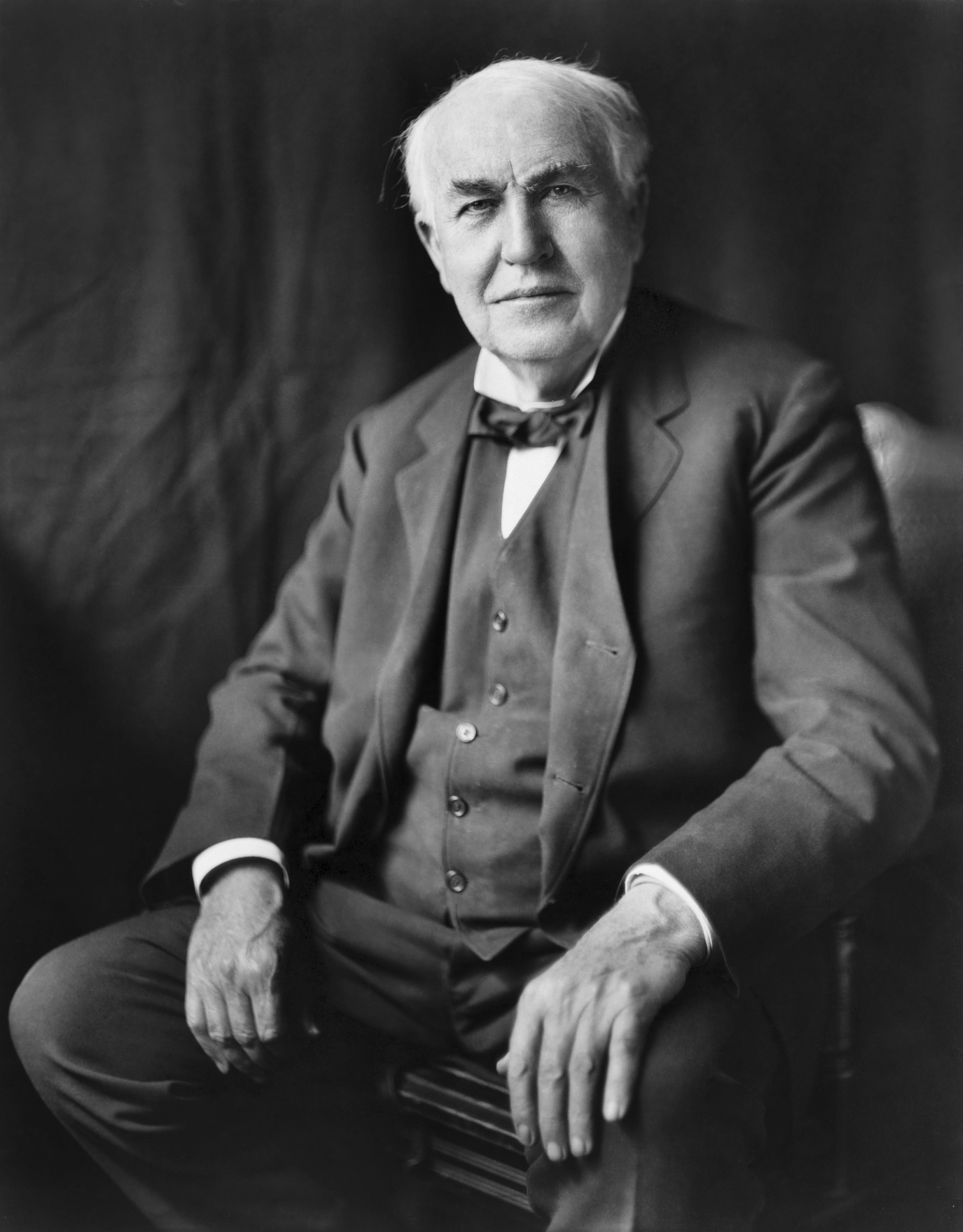
Thomas Edison circa 1922

== See also ==
- List of mountain peaks of Alaska
- Geography of Alaska
