= Mount Elusive =

Mountain in Alaska, United States

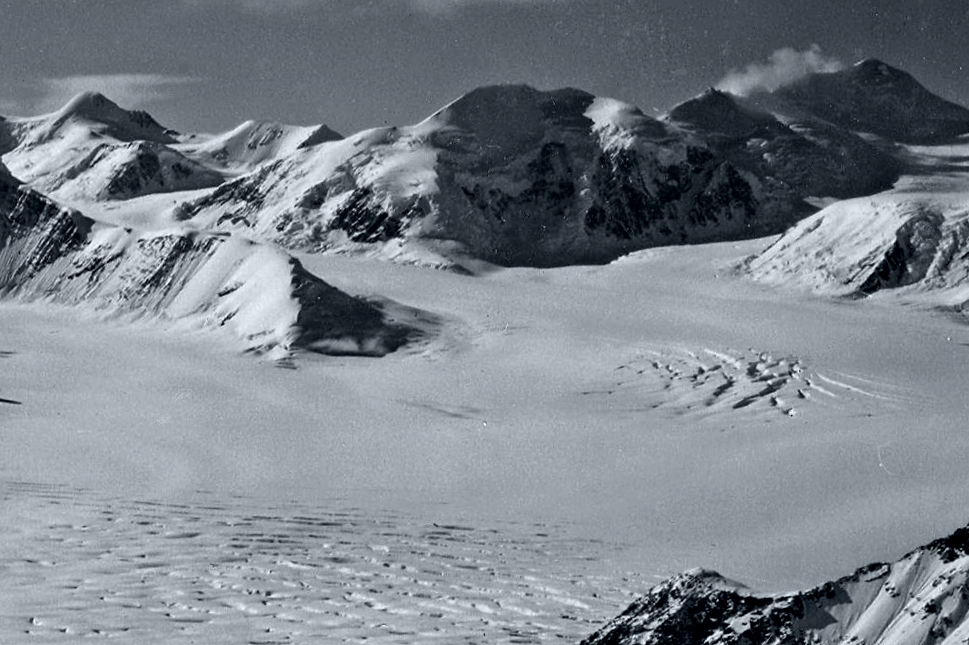
- Aerial view looking west with Mt. Elusive centered, Mt. Edison upper left, and Mt. Gilbert Lewis in upper right, with Columbia Glacier down in front

Highest point
- Elevation: 11,465 ft (3,495 m)
- Prominence: 715 ft (218 m)
- Parent peak: Mount Gilbert Lewis (12,250 ft)
- Isolation: 1.78 mi (2.86 km)
- Coordinates: 61°25′41″N 147°07′36″W

Geography
- Location within Alaska
- Interactive map of Mount Elusive
- Location: Chugach National Forest; Copper River Census Area; Alaska, United States
- Parent range: Chugach Mountains
- Topo map: USGS Anchorage B-1

Climbing
- First ascent: June 22, 1957
- Easiest route: South ridge

Mount Elusive is an 11,465-foot (3,495 m) elevation glaciated summit located 36 mi (58 km) northwest of Valdez in the Chugach Mountains of the U.S. state of Alaska. Set on land managed by Chugach National Forest, this remote peak is situated 3 mi (5 km) northeast of Mount Edison, 3 mi (5 km) southwest of Mount Valhalla, and 4.8 mi (8 km) north of Mount Einstein, near the head Columbia Glacier. It is part of the Dora Keen Range, which is a 25-miles-long divide separating Harvard Glacier from Yale Glacier. The mountain was so named in 1957 by Lawrence E. Nielsen because of the peak's "elusive character in trying to locate its position on the map from aerial photos," and later officially adopted by the U.S. Board on Geographic Names in 1965. Nielsen was leader of the Chugach Mountains Expedition which was sponsored by the Arctic Institute of North America. The first ascent of this mountain was made June 22, 1957, by Nielsen and expedition party via the south ridge. He described the most distinguishing feature of this snow-covered mountain as being a spectacular north–south knife-edge summit ridge.

== Climate ==
Based on the Köppen climate classification, Mount Elusive is located in a subarctic climate zone with long, cold, snowy winters, and cool summers. Weather systems coming off the Gulf of Alaska are forced upwards by the Chugach Mountains (orographic lift), causing heavy precipitation in the form of rainfall and snowfall. Temperatures can drop below −20 °C with wind chill factors below −30 °C. This climate supports the Harvard and Columbia Glaciers surrounding this mountain. The months May through June offer the most favorable weather for climbing.

== See also ==
- List of mountain peaks of Alaska
- Geography of Alaska
