= Mount Glenn (Alaska) =

Mountain in Alaska, United States

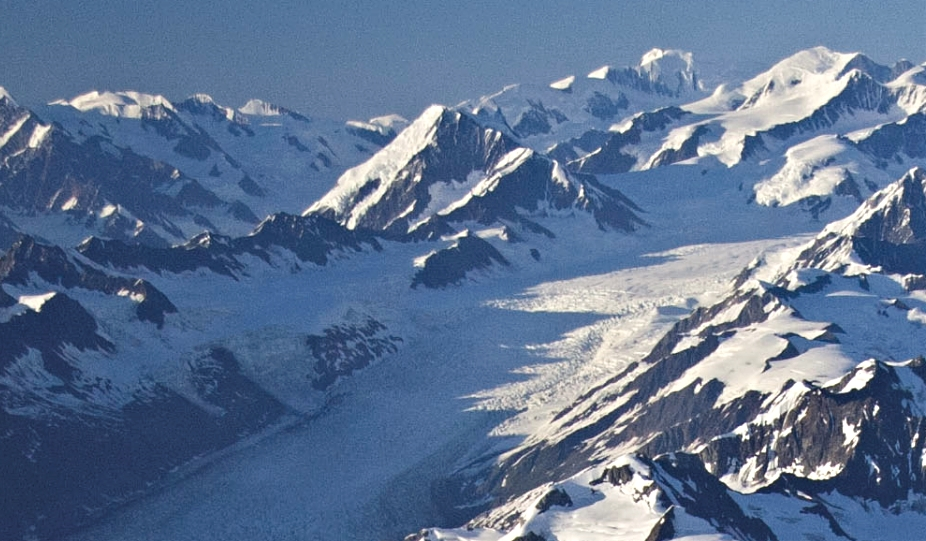
- Mt. Glenn centered with Yale Glacier featured

Highest point
- Elevation: 9,806 ft (2,989 m)
- Prominence: 2,006 ft (611 m)
- Parent peak: Mount Witherspoon (12,012 ft)
- Isolation: 3.52 mi (5.66 km)
- Coordinates: 61°21′31″N 147°22′45″W

Geography
- Location within Alaska
- Interactive map of Mount Glenn
- Location: Chugach National Forest; Copper River Census Area; Alaska, United States
- Parent range: Chugach Mountains
- Topo map: USGS Anchorage B-2

Climbing
- Easiest route: Mountaineering

Mount Glenn is a 9,806-foot (2,989 m) elevation glaciated summit located 40 mi (64 km) northwest of Valdez in the Chugach Mountains of the U.S. state of Alaska. This remote mountain north of Prince William Sound, set on land managed by Chugach National Forest, is situated 6.44 mi (10 km) west-southwest of Mount Witherspoon, and 9.34 mi (15 km) west of Mount Einstein. It is part of the Dora Keen Range, which is a 25-miles-long divide separating Harvard Glacier from Yale Glacier. The mountain's name was applied in 1911 by Lawrence Martin, and officially adopted in 1930 by the U.S. Board on Geographic Names to honor Edwin Forbes Glenn (1857–1926), an Army officer who explored this College Fjord area in 1898. The Glenn Highway is also named for this same person.

== Climate ==
Based on the Köppen climate classification, Mount Glenn is located in a subarctic climate zone with long, cold, snowy winters, and mild summers. Weather systems coming off the Gulf of Alaska are forced upwards by the Chugach Mountains (orographic lift), causing heavy precipitation in the form of rainfall and snowfall. Temperatures can drop below −20 °C with wind chill factors below −30 °C. This climate supports the Harvard and Yale Glaciers surrounding this mountain. The months May through June offer the most favorable weather for climbing or viewing.

== Gallery ==
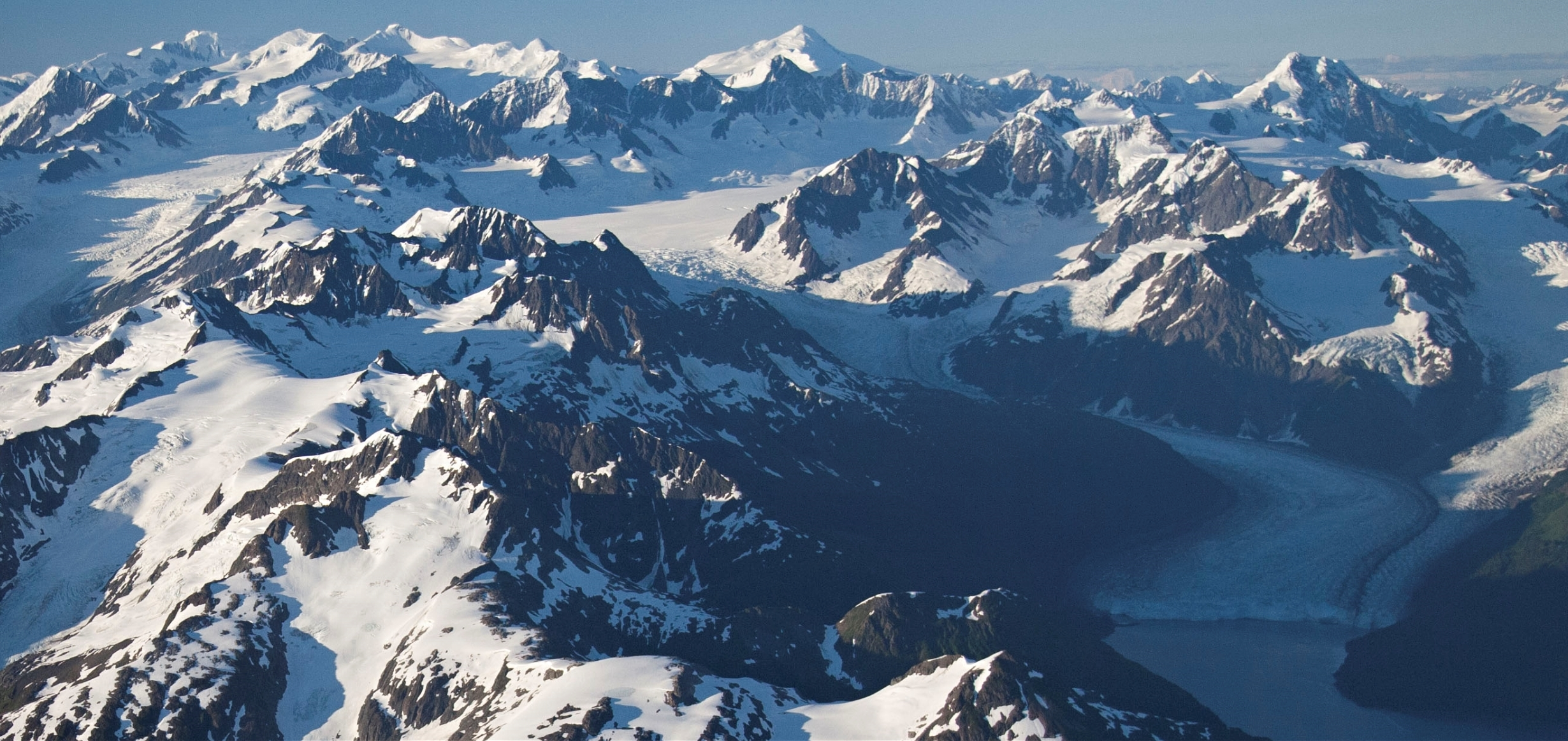
Mount Glenn in upper left corner of frame

== See also ==
- List of mountain peaks of Alaska
- Geography of Alaska
- Mount Castner
