= Mount Witherspoon =

Mountain in Alaska, United States

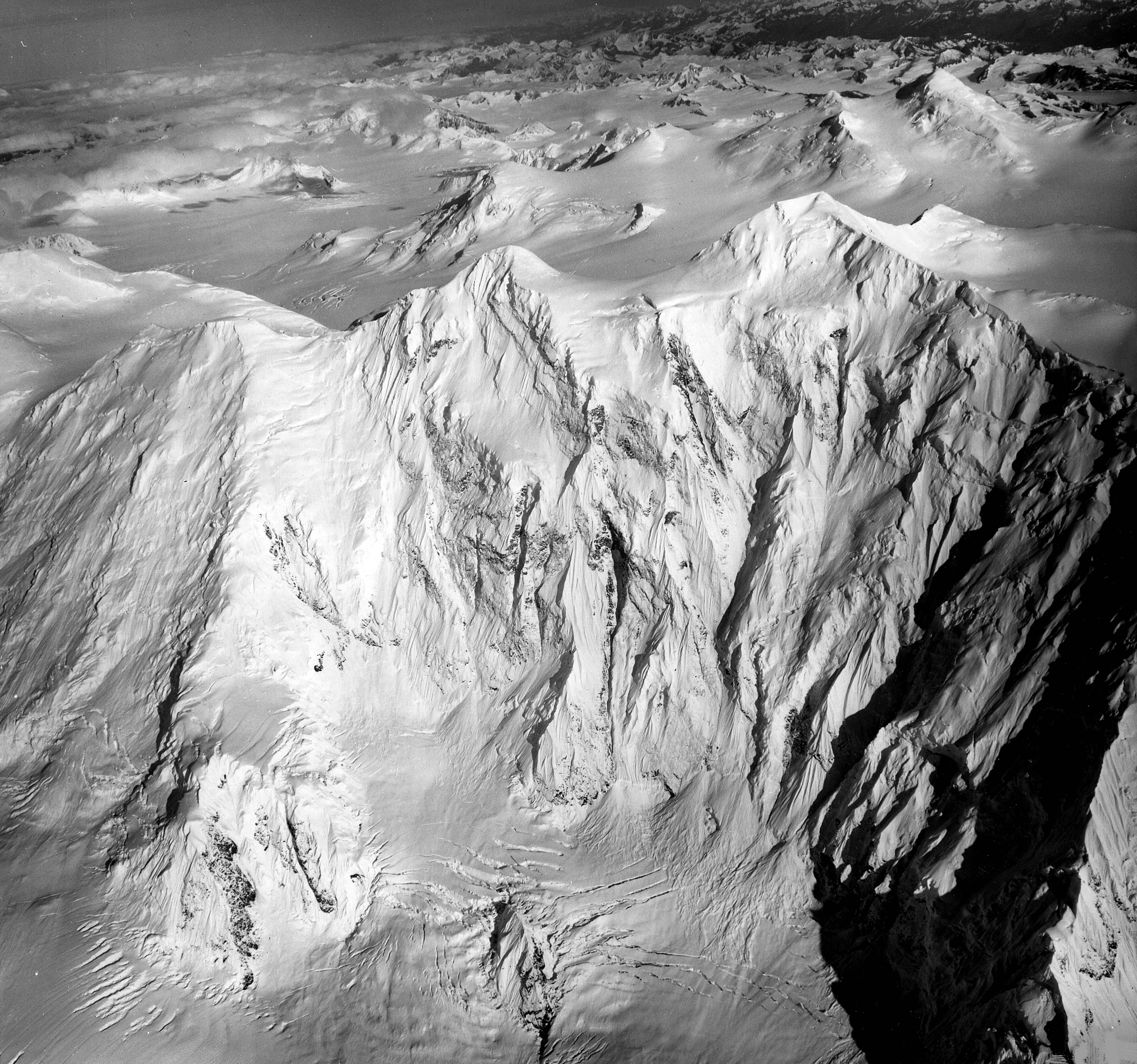
- Mt. Witherspoon right of center, from NW (Mount Edison slightly left of center)

Highest point
- Elevation: 12,012 ft (3,661 m)
- Prominence: 2,162 ft (659 m)
- Parent peak: Mount Gilbert Lewis (12,250+ ft)
- Isolation: 4.13 mi (6.65 km)
- Listing: Highest major summits of the US; 3000-meter summits of the US
- Coordinates: 61°23′44″N 147°12′03″W

Geography
- Location within Alaska
- Interactive map of Mount Witherspoon
- Location: Chugach National Forest; Copper River Census Area; Alaska, United States
- Parent range: Chugach Mountains
- Topo map: USGS Anchorage B-1

Climbing
- First ascent: June 25, 1957

Mount Witherspoon is a 12,012-foot-elevation (3,661-meter) glaciated summit located 36 mi (58 km) northwest of Valdez in the Chugach Mountains of the U.S. state of Alaska. It is set on land managed by Chugach National Forest. This remote mountain, fifth-highest in the Chugach range, is situated 4.33 mi (7 km) northwest of Mount Einstein, with the heads of Yale Glacier and Columbia Glacier between the summits. It is the second-highest peak in the Dora Keen Range, which is the 25-miles-long divide separating Harvard Glacier from Yale Glacier. The mountain's name was officially adopted in 1928 by the U.S. Board on Geographic Names to honor David C. Witherspoon, a U.S. Geological Survey topographer for 30 years, "who at the time of his retirement in 1921 had mapped a greater area of Alaska than any other man." The first ascent of Mount Witherspoon was made June 25, 1957, by David Bohn, Arthur Maki Jr., Martin Mushkin, and Lawrence E. Nielsen.

== Climate ==
Based on the Köppen climate classification, Mount Witherspoon is located in a subarctic climate zone with long, cold, snowy winters, and mild summers. Weather systems coming off the Gulf of Alaska are forced upwards by the Chugach Mountains (orographic lift), causing heavy precipitation in the form of rainfall and snowfall. Temperatures can drop below −20 °C with wind chill factors below −30 °C. This climate supports the Harvard, Yale, and Columbia Glaciers surrounding this mountain. The months May through June offer the most favorable weather for climbing or viewing.

== Gallery ==
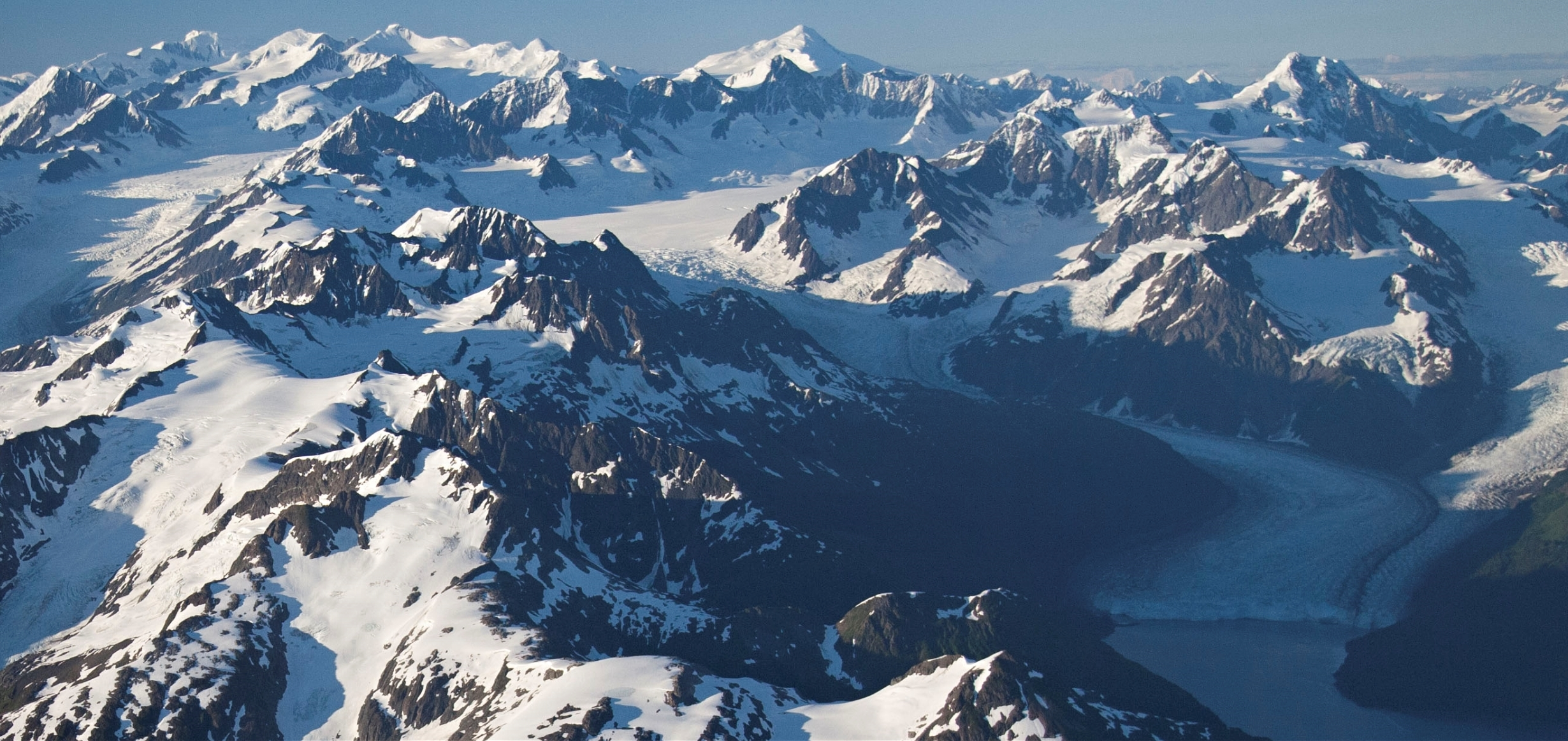
Mount Witherspoon in upper left top of frame

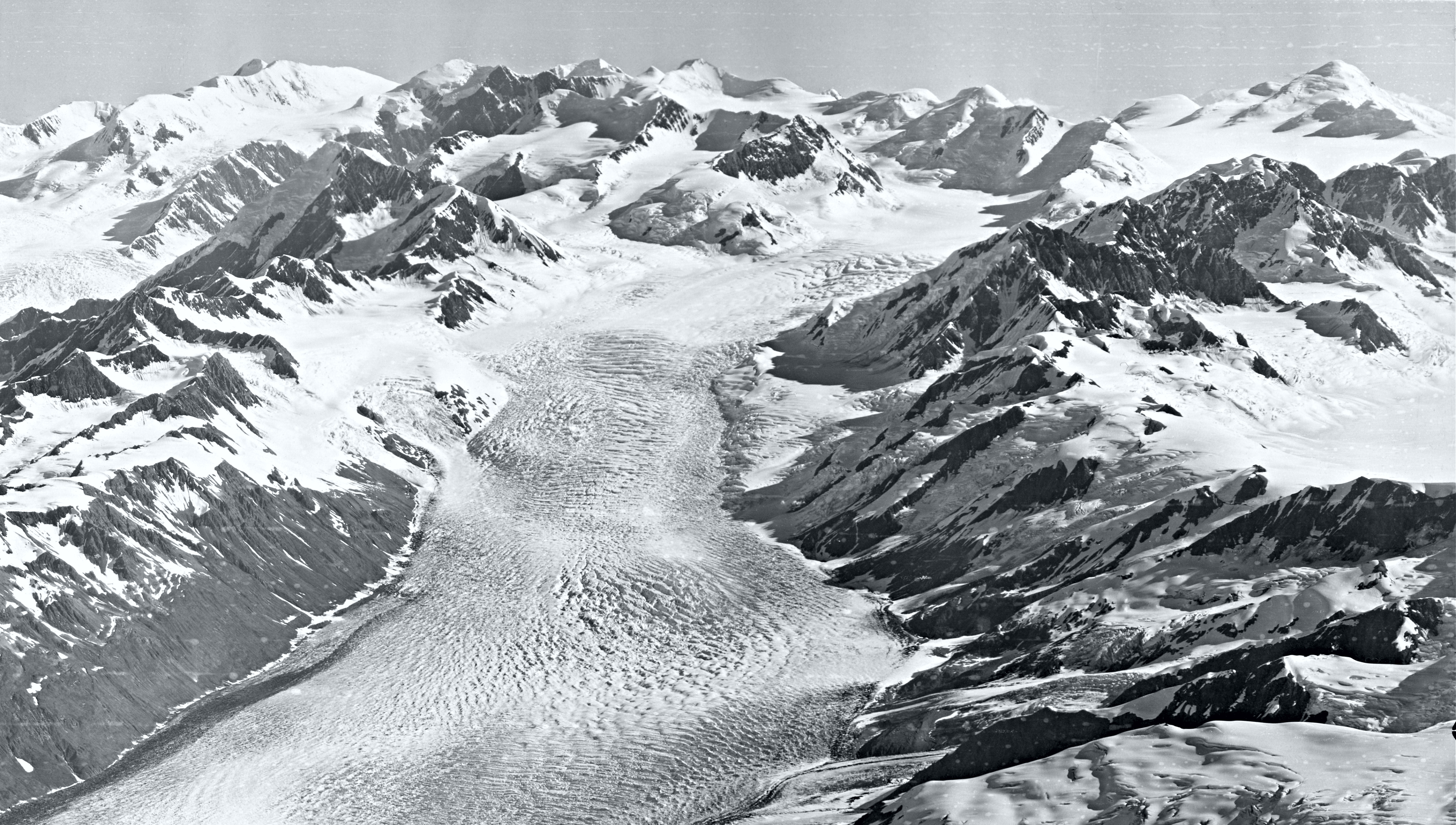
Mount Witherspoon centered at top of frame. (Yale Glacier featured, Mt. Einstein upper right)

== See also ==
- List of mountain peaks of Alaska
- Geography of Alaska
