= Mount Castner =

Mountain in Alaska, United States

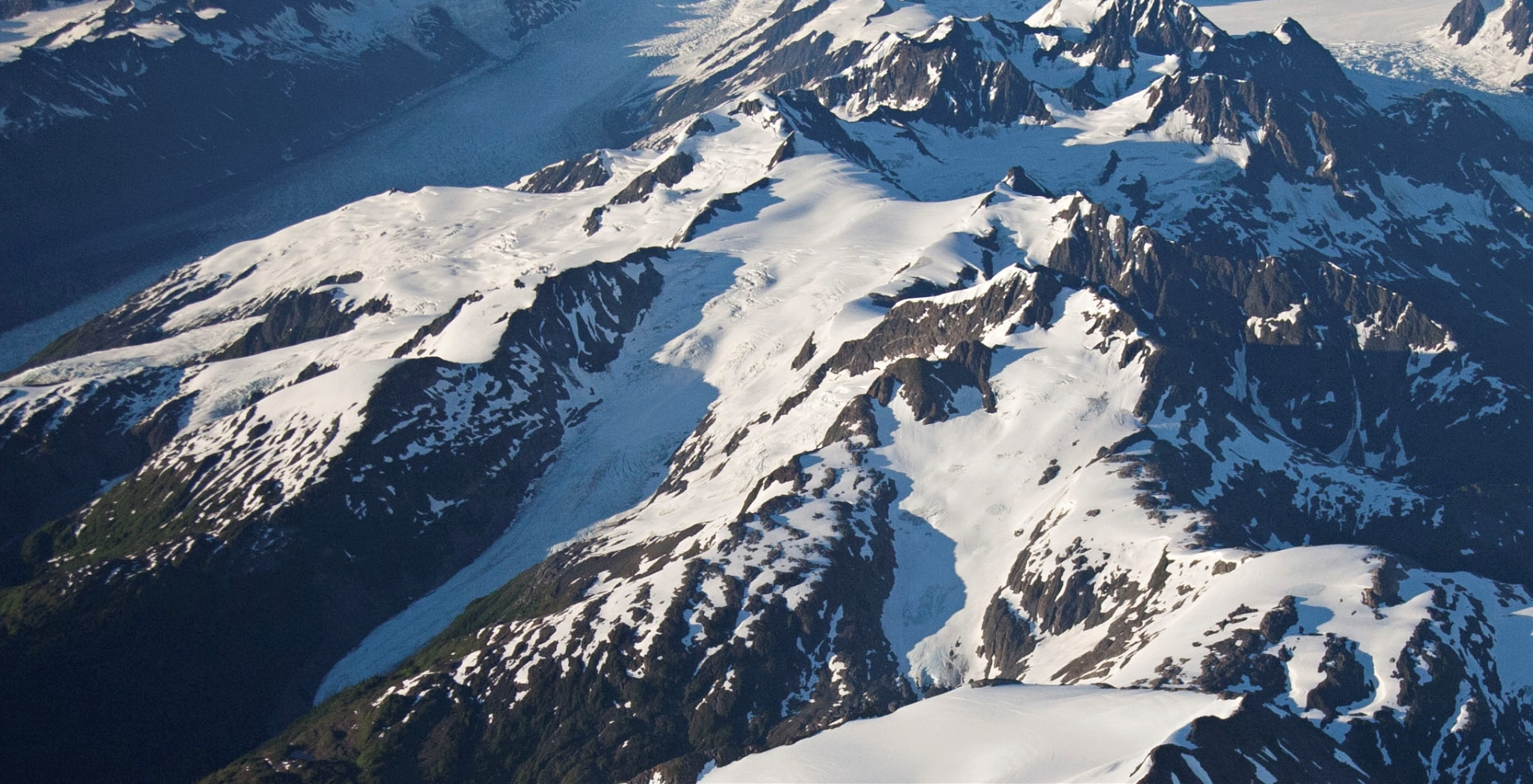
- Aerial view of west aspect

Highest point
- Elevation: 5,535 ft (1,687 m)
- Prominence: 585 ft (178 m)
- Parent peak: Peak 6140
- Isolation: 1.41 mi (2.27 km)
- Coordinates: 61°11′24″N 147°35′02″W

Geography
- Location within Alaska
- Interactive map of Mount Castner
- Location: Chugach National Forest; Chugach Census Area; Alaska, United States
- Parent range: Chugach Mountains
- Topo map: USGS Anchorage A-2

Mount Castner is a 5,535-foot (1,687 m) elevation glaciated summit located 44 mi (71 km) west of Valdez in the Chugach Mountains of the U.S. state of Alaska, on land managed by Chugach National Forest. It is situated at the head of Ranney Glacier and Dartmouth Glacier. Although modest in elevation, relief is significant since the mountain rises from tidewater at Unakwik Inlet and College Fjord of Prince William Sound in approximately three miles. The mountain's name was applied in 1910 by Lawrence Martin, and officially adopted by the United States Geological Survey. This peak's name honors Joseph Compton Castner (1869–1946), who was with Captain Edwin F. Glenn during the exploration of this area in 1898.

== Climate ==
Based on the Köppen climate classification, Mount Castner is located in a subarctic climate zone with long, cold, snowy winters, and mild summers. Weather systems coming off the Gulf of Alaska are forced upwards by the Chugach Mountains (orographic lift), causing heavy precipitation in the form of rainfall and snowfall. Temperatures can drop below −20 °C with wind chill factors below −30 °C. This climate supports the Meares and Yale Glaciers surrounding this mountain. The months May through June offer the most favorable weather for climbing or viewing.

== Gallery ==
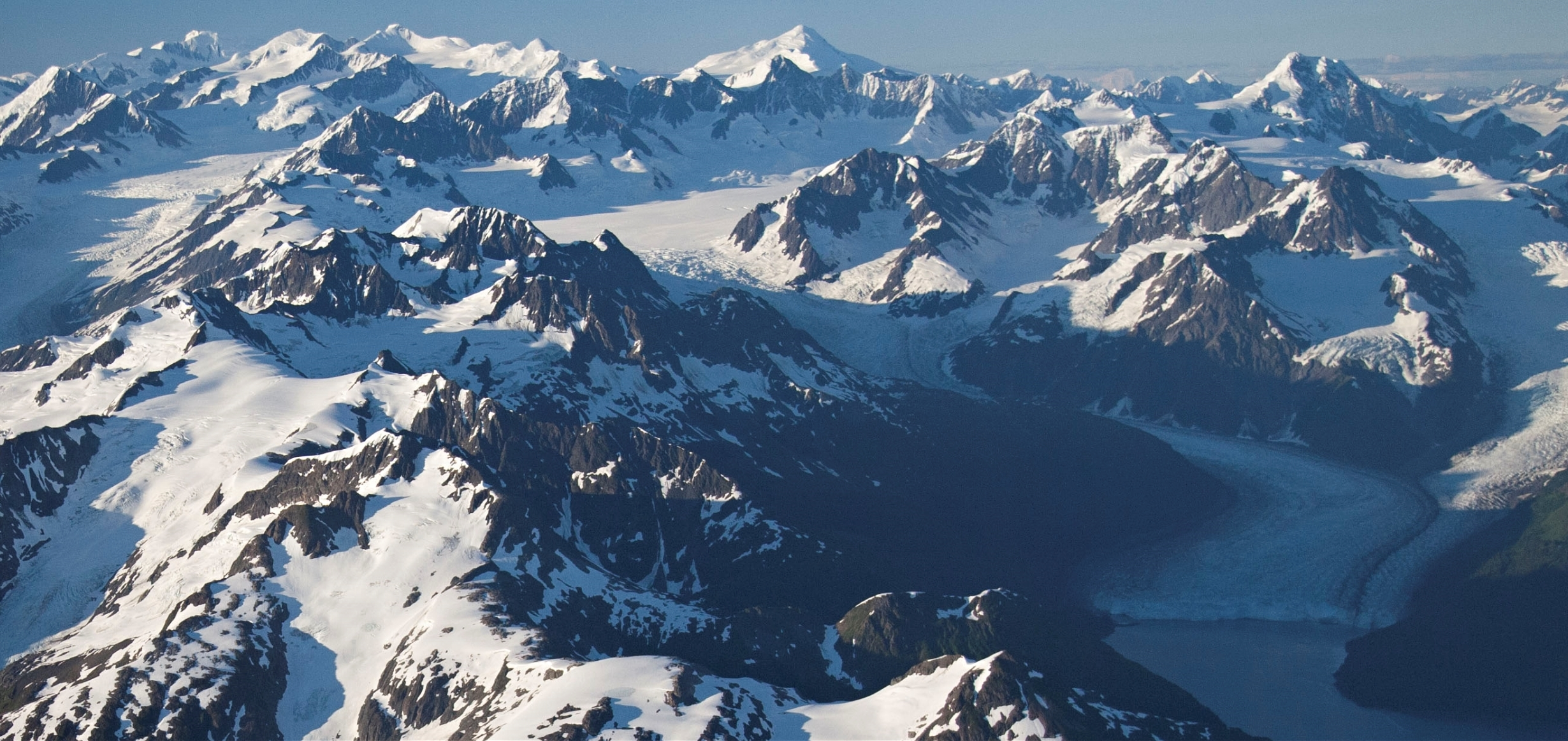
Mount Castner in lower left corner of frame. Mount Grosvenor and Meares Glacier to right.

== See also ==
- List of mountain peaks of Alaska
- Geography of Alaska
- Mount Glenn
