= William Williams Keen =

First U.S. brain surgeon (1837–1932)

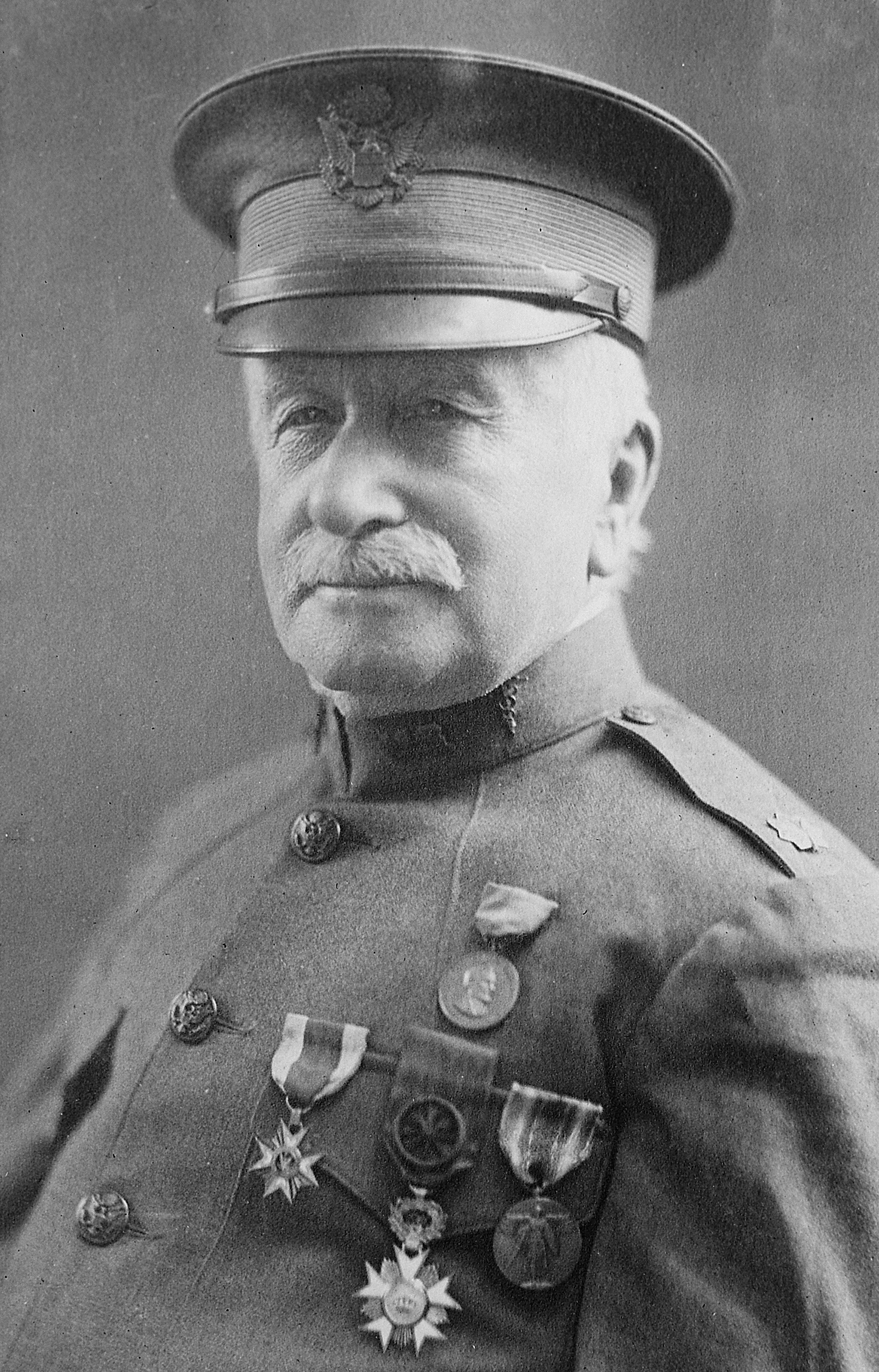
- Keen in 1917
- Born: William Williams Keen Jr. January 19, 1837; Philadelphia, Pennsylvania, U.S.
- Died: June 7, 1932 (aged 95); Philadelphia, Pennsylvania, U.S.
- Education: Brown University; Jefferson Medical College
- Occupation: Surgeon
- Children: Dora Keen
- Relatives: Walter Jackson Freeman II (grandson); Walter Jackson Freeman III (great grandson)

William Williams Keen Jr. (January 19, 1837 – June 7, 1932) was an American physician and the first brain surgeon in the United States. During his lifetime, Keen worked with six American presidents.

== Early life and education ==
Keen was born in Philadelphia on January 19, 1837, to William Williams Keen Sr. (1797–1882) and Susan Budd. He attended Saunders's Academy and Philadelphia's Central High School. Keen graduated from Brown University, with an A.B. in 1859. He then obtained a degree in medicine from Jefferson Medical College in 1862.

== During the American Civil War ==
Keen served as a surgeon for the Fifth Massachusetts Militia Regiment and then for the Union Army during the American Civil War. While serving, Keen built a reputation for his work with patients who had neurological wounds, mainly because most surgeons refrained from treating neurological wounds. He also worked with S. Weir Mitchell to study nervous system injuries. Together, they published Gunshot Wounds and Other Injuries of the Nerves and Reflex Paralysis in 1864, which first described many unknown neurological conditions, such as causalgia, reflex sympathetic dystrophy, and secondary paralysis. After the war concluded, Keen studied in Paris and Berlin for two years.

== Career ==
Keen began to teach pathological anatomy and prepared the first-ever surgical pathology course at Jefferson Medical College. He also established the school's first surgical research lab. Keen was president of the Philadelphia School of Anatomy from 1875 to 1889. He also taught at the Pennsylvania Academy of the Fine Arts and the Woman's Medical College of Pennsylvania. He was known in the international medical community for inventing brain surgery procedures, including drainage of the cerebral ventricles and removal of brain tumors. Keen also performed the first craniectomy for microcephalus; however, this technique was met with harsh criticism and had relatively little success. In addition, Keen co-edited An American Text-Book of Surgery for Practitioners with J. William White, the first American surgery text published in four editions.

Keen was the leader of a team of five that performed a secret surgical operation to remove a cancerous jaw tumor on Grover Cleveland in 1893 aboard Elias Cornelius Benedict's yacht Oneida. Keen and four assisting doctors made their way to the yacht by boat from separate points in New York, with Cleveland and Bryant boarding in the evening for the night before sailing the next morning. With calm weather and steady waters, the surgery was finished quickly as the ship transited from Long Island Sound during noontime. The procedure involved the removal of the tumor and five teeth, as well as much of the upper left palate and jawbone.

Later, Keen performed a follow-up surgery to remove excess tissue and to cauterize the wound. On July 5, Cleveland arrived at Gray Gables to recuperate and was fishing in Buzzards Bay by the end of the month.

== Personal life ==
Keen was a theistic evolutionist; he authored the book I Believe in God and in Evolution in 1922. Keen was a staunch proponent of vivisection and wrote articles attacking the arguments of anti-vivisectionists, some of which were republished in his 1914 book, Animal Experimentation and Medical Progress.

In 1867, Keen married Emma Corinna Borden, from Fall River, Massachusetts, who died in 1886. They had four children: Corinne, Florence, Dora, and Margaret. He died in Philadelphia on June 7, 1932, at the age of 95 and is buried at The Woodlands Cemetery.

== Honors and recognition ==
He received honorary degrees from Jefferson Medical College, Brown University, Northwestern University, University of Toronto, University of Edinburgh, Yale University, University of St Andrews, University of Greifswald, and Uppsala University.

He also served as president of the American Surgical Association in 1898, the American Medical Association in 1900, the Congress of American Physicians and Surgeons in 1903, and the American Philosophical Society after 1907 (elected in 1884).

When the International Surgical Association met in 1914, he was elected president for the meeting in 1917. After 1894, he was a foreign corresponding member of the Société de Chirurgie de Paris, the Société Belge de Chirurgie, and the Clinical Society of London as well as an honorary fellow of the Royal College of Surgeons of England, the Royal College of Surgeons of Edinburgh, the German Society of Surgery, the Palermo Surgical Society, and the Berliner Medizinische Gesellschaft. He was also made an associate fellow of the American Academy of Arts and Sciences.

== Things named after him ==
- Keen's operation, an omphalectomy
- Keen's point, an access point to the skull cavity used in neurosurgery
- Keen's sign, increased diameter of the leg at the malleoli in Pott's fracture of the fibula

== Selected publications ==
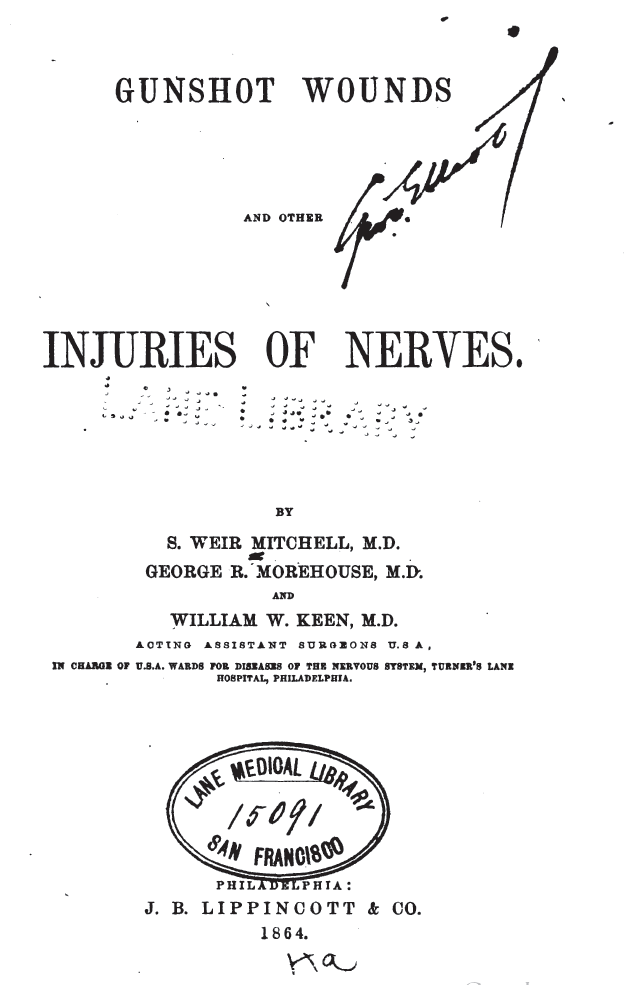
Gunshot Wounds, and Other Injuries of Nerves by Mitchell, Morehouse, and Keen, 1864

- Clinical Charts of the Human Body (1870)
- Early History of Practical Anatomy (1875)
- Surgical Complications and Sequels of Typhoid Fever (1898)
- Addresses and Other Papers (1905)
- an edition of Heath's Practical Anatomy (1870)
- the New American from the Eleventh English Edition of Gray's Anatomy (September 1887)
- the New American from the Thirteenth English Edition of Gray's Anatomy (September 1893)
- the American Text-Book of Surgery (1899, 1903)
- Keen's System of Surgery (1905–13)
- I Believe in God and in Evolution (1922)
- Everlasting Life: A Creed and a Speculation (1924)
- History of the First Baptist Church, Philadelphia (1898)
- The Surgical Operations on President Cleveland in 1893 (1917)
- Medical Research and Human Welfare (1917)

=== Vivisection ===
Keen authored numerous works defending vivisection:

- Our Recent Debts to Vivisection (1885)
- Misstatements of Antivivisectionists (1901)
- The Progress of Surgery as Influenced by Vivisection (1901)
- Dr. Snow and Vivisection (1911)
- The Influence of Antivivisection on Character (1912)
- Animal Experimentation and Medical Progress (1914)
- The Inveracities of Antivivisection (1916)
- The Red Cross and the Antivivisectionists (1918)

=== Co-authored ===
- Gunshot Wounds, and Other Injuries of Nerves, together with Silas Weir Mitchell, George Read Morehouse (1864)

=== Edited ===
- Gray's Anatomy 1883, 1887 and 1892 editions
- Surgery, Its Principles and Practice (1906).
- Practical Anatomy – Manual of Dissections (1870)
- American Health Primers (1879)
- An American Text-Book of Surgery, 1905 to 1921
