= Dartmouth Glacier =

Glacier in Alaska, United States

- Location within Alaska
- Interactive map of Dartmouth Glacier
- Type: glacier
- Location: Coghill River, Alaska, U.S.
- Coordinates: 61°10′11″N 147°37′04″W
- Length: 3.4 miles (5.5 km)
- Terminus: 3,189 feet (972 m)

The Dartmouth Glacier is a 3.4-mile (5.5 km)-long glacier in the U.S. state of Alaska. It heads southwest of Mount Castner in the Chugach Mountains and trends southwest to its terminus at the head of the Coghill River, 47 miles (76 km) west of Valdez. The name was reported in 1908 by Grant and Higgins (1910, pl. 2), USGS. It is presumably named for Dartmouth College in Hanover, New Hampshire.

== See also ==
- List of glaciers
