= Yale Glacier =

Glacier in Alaska, United States

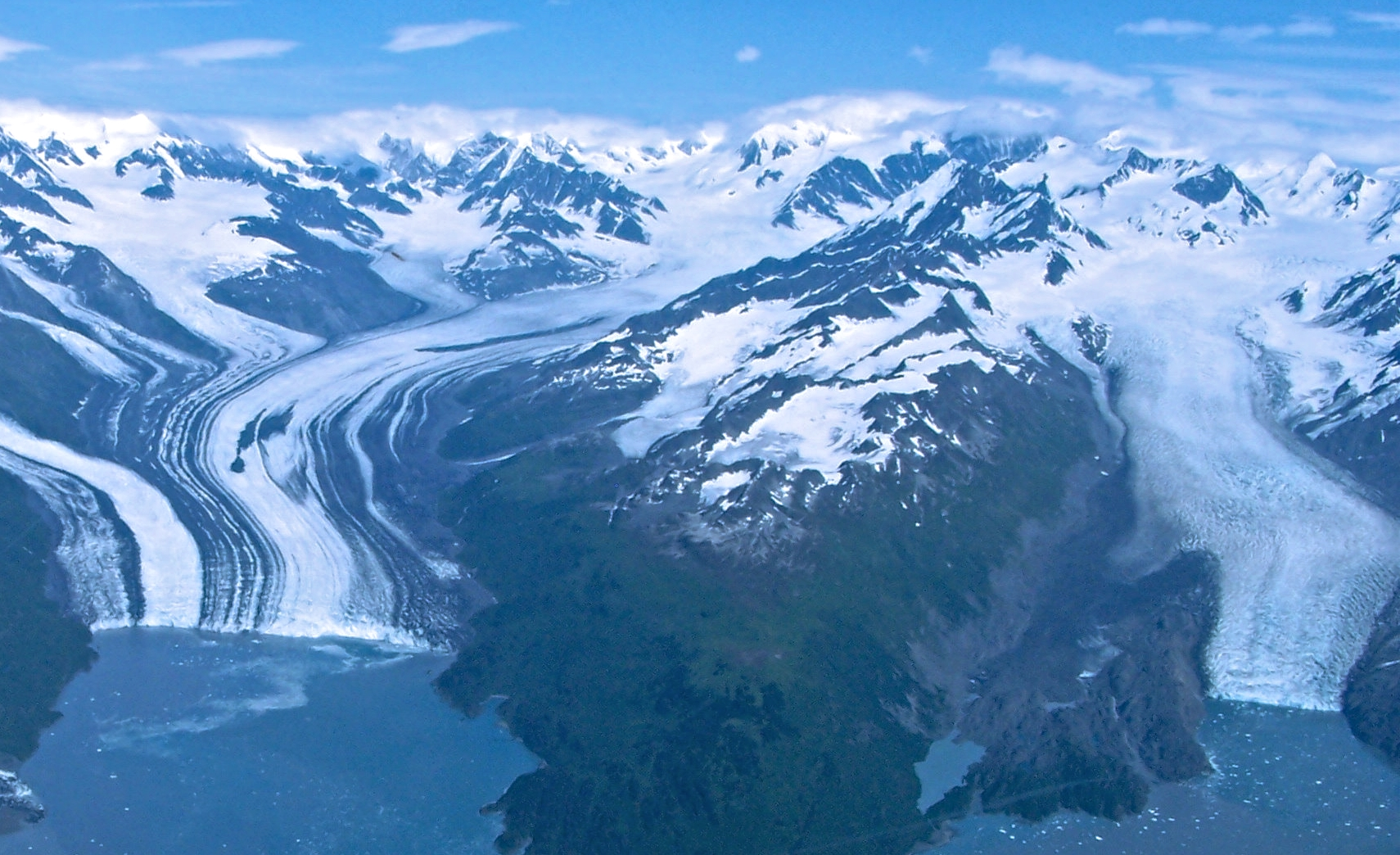
- Yale Glacier on right (Harvard Glacier to left)

- Location within Alaska
- Interactive map of Yale Glacier
- Type: Tidewater glacier
- Location: College Fjord, Alaska, U.S.
- Coordinates: 61°17′16″N 147°28′40″W
- Length: 20 mi (32 km)
- Terminus: sealevel
- Status: retreating

Yale Glacier is a 20 mi (32 km) long glacier in the U.S. state of Alaska. It begins at the saddle between Mount Witherspoon and Mount Einstein, and trends southwest to Yale Arm of College Fjord, 47 miles (76 km) west of Valdez. It was named for Yale University by members of the 1899 Harriman Alaska Expedition.

== Geography ==
Yale Glacier is 20 miles long. Its width varies from a mile and a quarter to two miles. In its lower portion, the glacier slopes at the rate of 600 to 700 feet per mile, attaining an elevation of 2500 feet three miles and a half from the front, and ascending gradually to 6000 or 7000 foot cirques east of Mt. Glenn. The Yale Glacier, though wider at the terminus, is probably not as long as the Harvard Glacier. It terminates in the Yale Arm of College Fiord, with an unusually irregular front, the south side of the glacier extending \\ miles further down the fiord than the north side. This terminal cliff is between 200 and 300 feet high. There are well-marked lateral moraines, but no medial moraines. In the absence of a number of large tributaries which supply quantities of ice, and lateral moraines that become medials, Yale Glacier differs very decidedly from Harvard Glacier. The distant tributaries are rather small glaciers cascading from extensive neve fields on the mountain slopes. In the lower part of the glacier there are not many tributaries on the northwestern side, contrasting with a considerable number which descend on the southeastern side from the snowfields and cirques about Mt. Castner and other mountains between College Fiord and Unakwik Inlet.

Applegate's map of Yale Glacier in 1887 shows it terminating somewhere between College Point and the present stand; but since he did not approach the glacier nearer than 12 miles, about the same as Vancouver did in 1794, it is impossible to draw any conclusions from these early maps concerning the behavior of Yale Glacier prior to 1898. From a photograph taken by Mendenhall in the latter part of April, 1898, it is evident that the rock ledges were exposed beneath the middle of the ice front and the eastern half exhibited "the rough pinnacled front of a still-advancing stream. Its western front is of dead-white ice." On this same occasion, Castner went on snowshoes some distance up the margin of the Yale Glacier, which may perhaps show that it was then less severely crevassed than in 1910 when traveling upon its surface was impossible. Glenn gives a vivid description of Yale and Harvard glaciers as he saw them in 1898 from College Fiord. "The day was dry and clear. Directly in our front was the most imposing sight we had yet seen—I might add more imposing than any we saw during the season. Glistening in the sun were two large glaciers, which we named the 'Twin Glaciers,' t the pair being separated by a short ridge or hogback that runs down to salt water. In front of the one on our right the sea ice extended for over 3 miles, while in front of the other this sea ice extended at least twice that distance. This ice was covered with snow several feet in depth. We soon discovered that it would bear up the weight of a man and that we could make no headway against it with the boat. Each of these glaciers is what is termed 'live' or 'working' glaciers. The front of each was an almost perpendicular mass of ice, from which immense pieces were constantly breaking off and falling into the sea with a great roaring noise, due principally to the action of the tides."

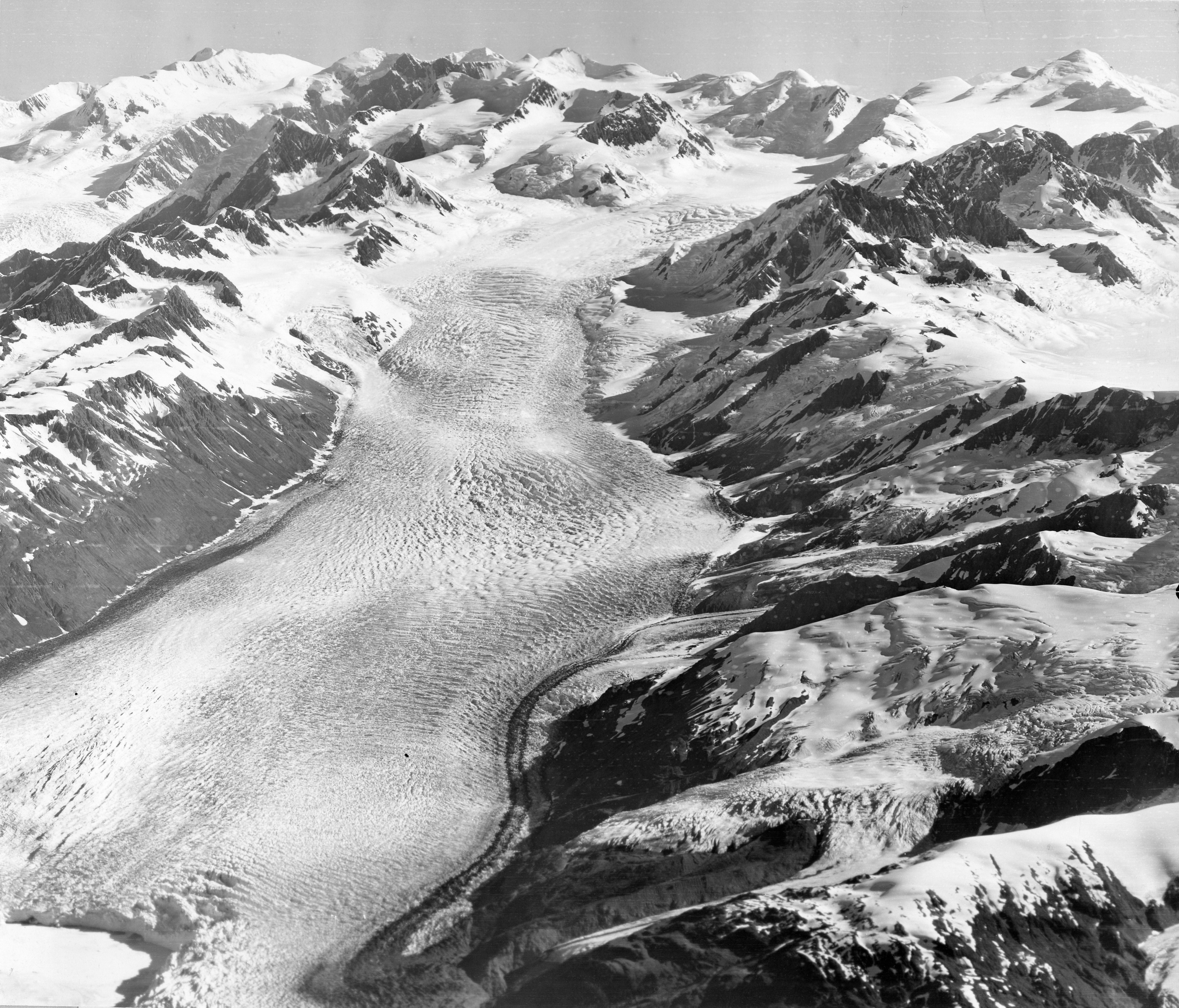
Yale Glacier in 1940s

The map of Yale Glacier by Gannett, the description by Gilbert, and the photographs by other members of the Harriman Expedition in 1899 show clearly that in all major features of position Yale Glacier had at that time assumed the general conditions which prevailed in 1910. The rock ledges beneath the center of the glacier are seen in the photographs, and Gilbert indicates that there were barren zones at the margins. He explains the dirty ice near the northwestern side of the glacier as follows: "A blackening, west of the middle, by glacial drift suggests that a rock knob may lie near the surface, ready to develop into a nunatak or island if the glacier shall diminish." The photographs and descriptions by Grant in 1905 and 1909, and the map by Higgins in the latter year show that Yale Glacier maintained essentially the same conditions during the decade following 1899. The narrowness of the barren zones in 1909 leads Grant to conclude that the eastern margin was slightly farther advanced in that year than in 1898 and 1899. In 1910, Yale Glacier was advancing strongly. The advance had covered most of the barren zone along the southeastern margin, though some still remained in places. Near the terminus the entire marginal barren zone was covered by ice, and bushes were being overridden, but in front of the glacier there were rock slopes bare of vegetation. Bordering part of the glacier margin was a push moraine of till, bowlders and wood, and there were also some peat rolls. The presence of recently overturned bushes lying on the winter's snow, proves that the advance was in progress during the spring of 1910. The northwestern margin of Yale Glacier was also advancing rapidly. At the water's edge the glacier terminated on beach and alluvial fan gravels in part undisturbed; but above tide level there was a gravel push moraine including some tree trunks. Farther back along this margin practically all the former barren zone had been overridden, and the glacier was destroying thickets of alder and willow bushes from 10 to 33 years old. The relationship to snow banks proves that part of this advance had taken place during the preceding autumn or early winter.

== See also ==
- List of glaciers
