= Mount Einstein =

Mountain in Alaska, United States

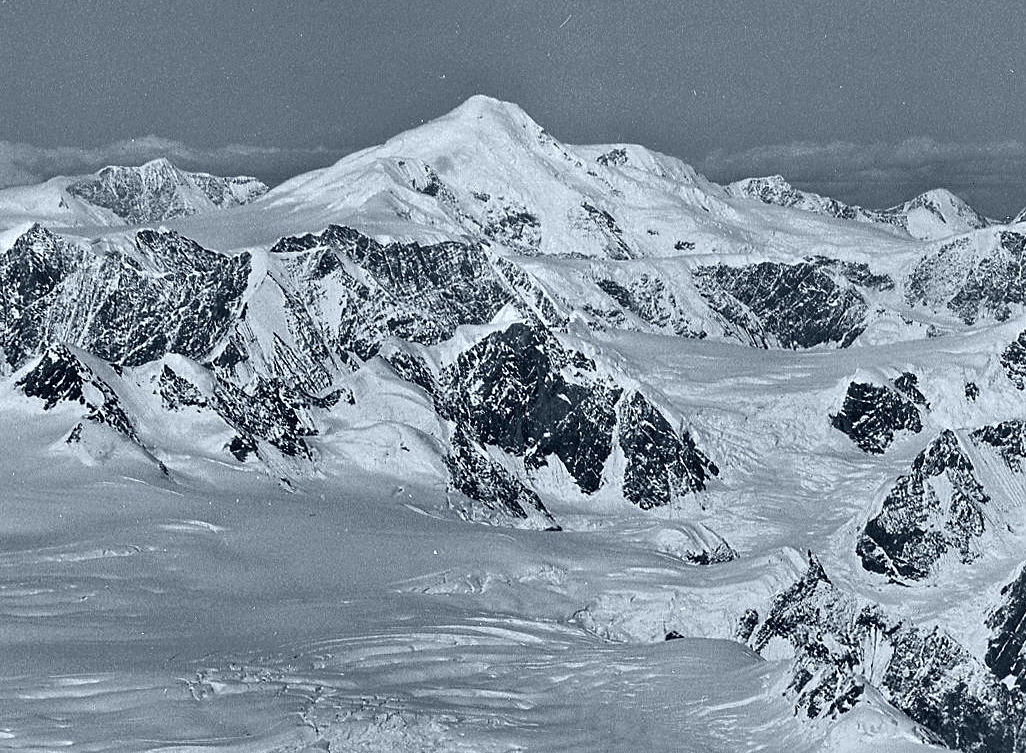
- Aerial view from the southwest

Highest point
- Elevation: 11,552 ft (3,521 m)
- Prominence: 2,552 ft (778 m)
- Parent peak: Mount Witherspoon (12,012 ft)
- Isolation: 4.34 mi (6.98 km)
- Coordinates: 61°21′24″N 147°05′54″W

Geography
- Location within Alaska
- Interactive map of Mount Einstein
- Location: Chugach National Forest; Copper River Census Area; Alaska, United States
- Parent range: Chugach Mountains
- Topo map: USGS Anchorage B-1

Climbing
- First ascent: June 17, 1957

Mount Einstein is an 11,552-foot (3,521 m) elevation glaciated summit located 32 mi (51 km) northwest of Valdez in the Chugach Mountains of the U.S. state of Alaska. This remote mountain, sixth-highest in the Chugach range, is situated at the head of Yale Glacier on land managed by Chugach National Forest. The mountain was named in 1955 by members of the Chugach Mountains Expedition, and officially adopted by the United States Geological Survey to honor physicist Dr. Albert Einstein (1879–1955), considered one of the greatest scientists of all time, known for his Theory of relativity. The first ascent of Mt. Einstein was made June 17, 1957, by David Bohn, Arthur Maki Jr., Don Mokski, Martin Mushkin, and Lawrence E. Nielsen.

== Climate ==
Based on the Köppen climate classification, Mount Einstein is located in a subarctic climate zone with long, cold, snowy winters, and mild summers. Weather systems coming off the Gulf of Alaska are forced upwards by the Chugach Mountains (orographic lift), causing heavy precipitation in the form of rainfall and snowfall. Temperatures can drop below −20 °C with wind chill factors below −30 °C. This climate supports the Yale and Columbia Glaciers surrounding this mountain. The months May through June offer the most favorable weather for climbing or viewing.

== Gallery ==
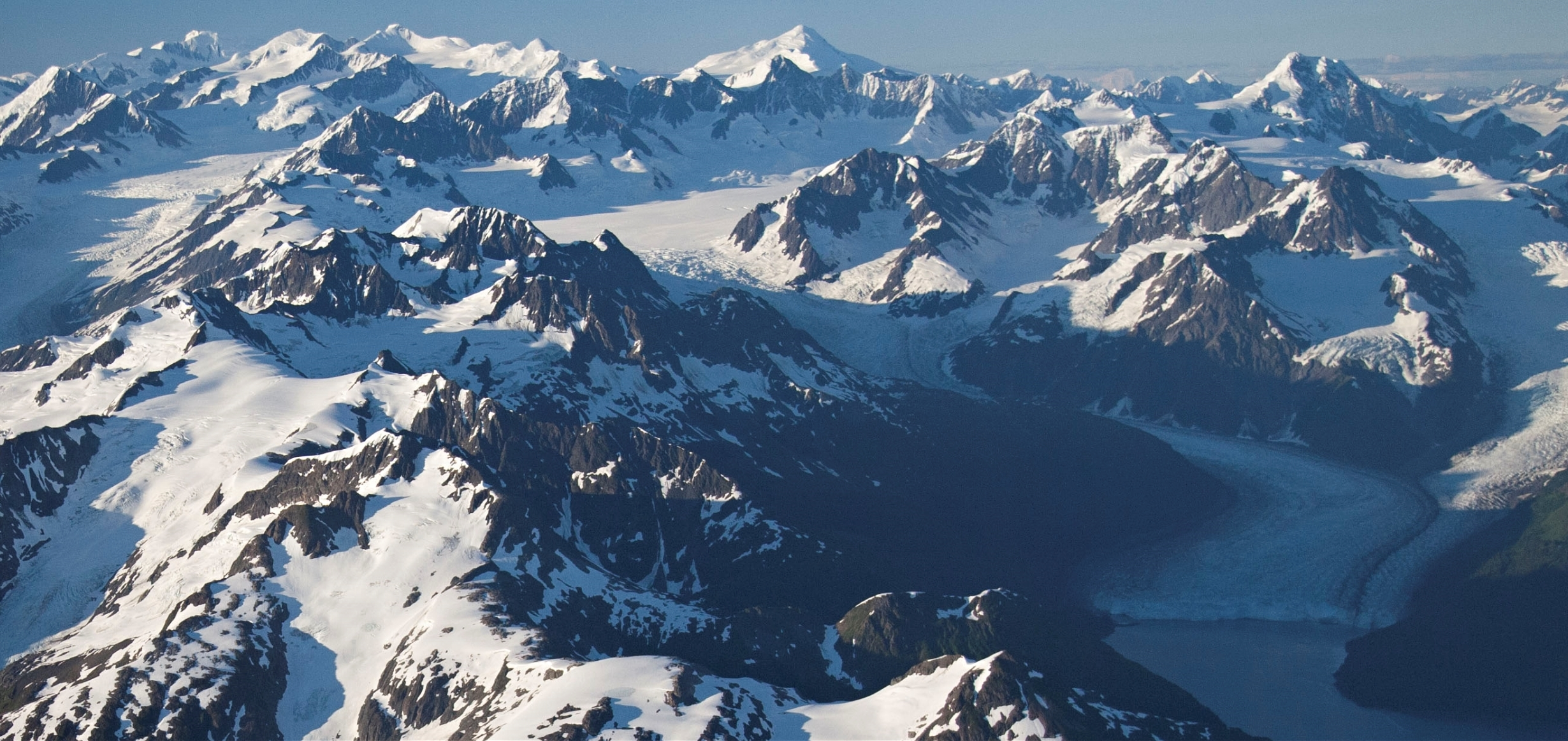
Mt. Einstein centered in the distance at top of frame

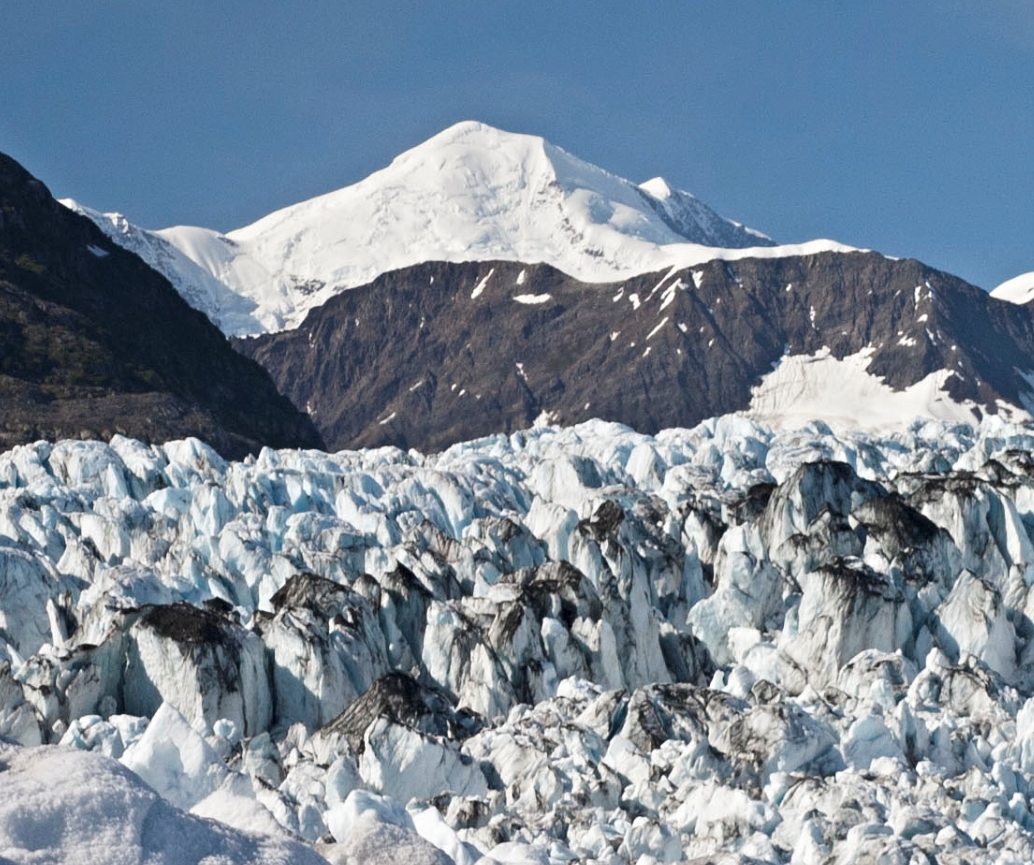
Mount Einstein and Columbia Glacier

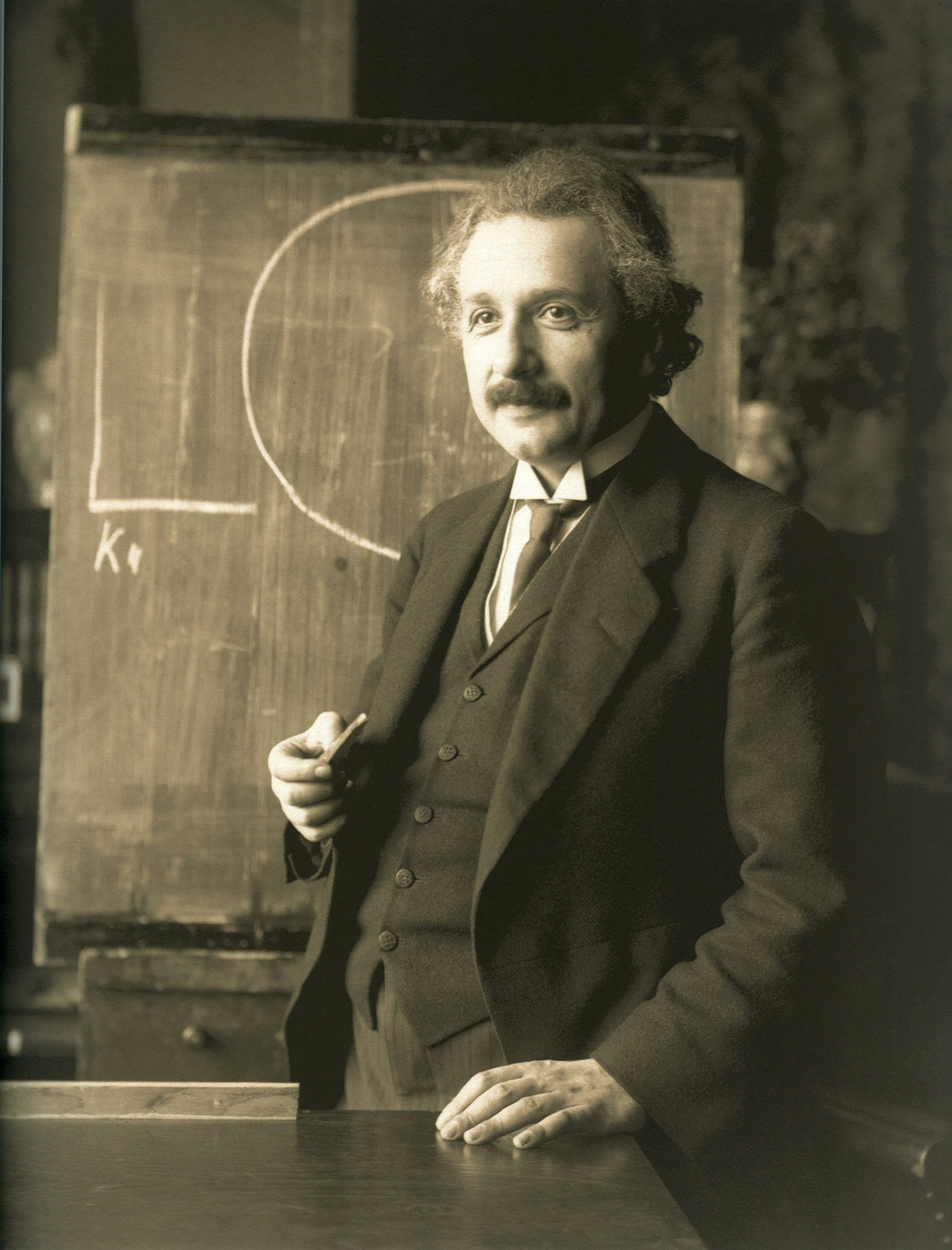
Dr. Einstein, 1921

== See also ==
- List of mountain peaks of Alaska
- Geography of Alaska
