= Columbia Glacier (Alaska) =

Glacier in Alaska, United States

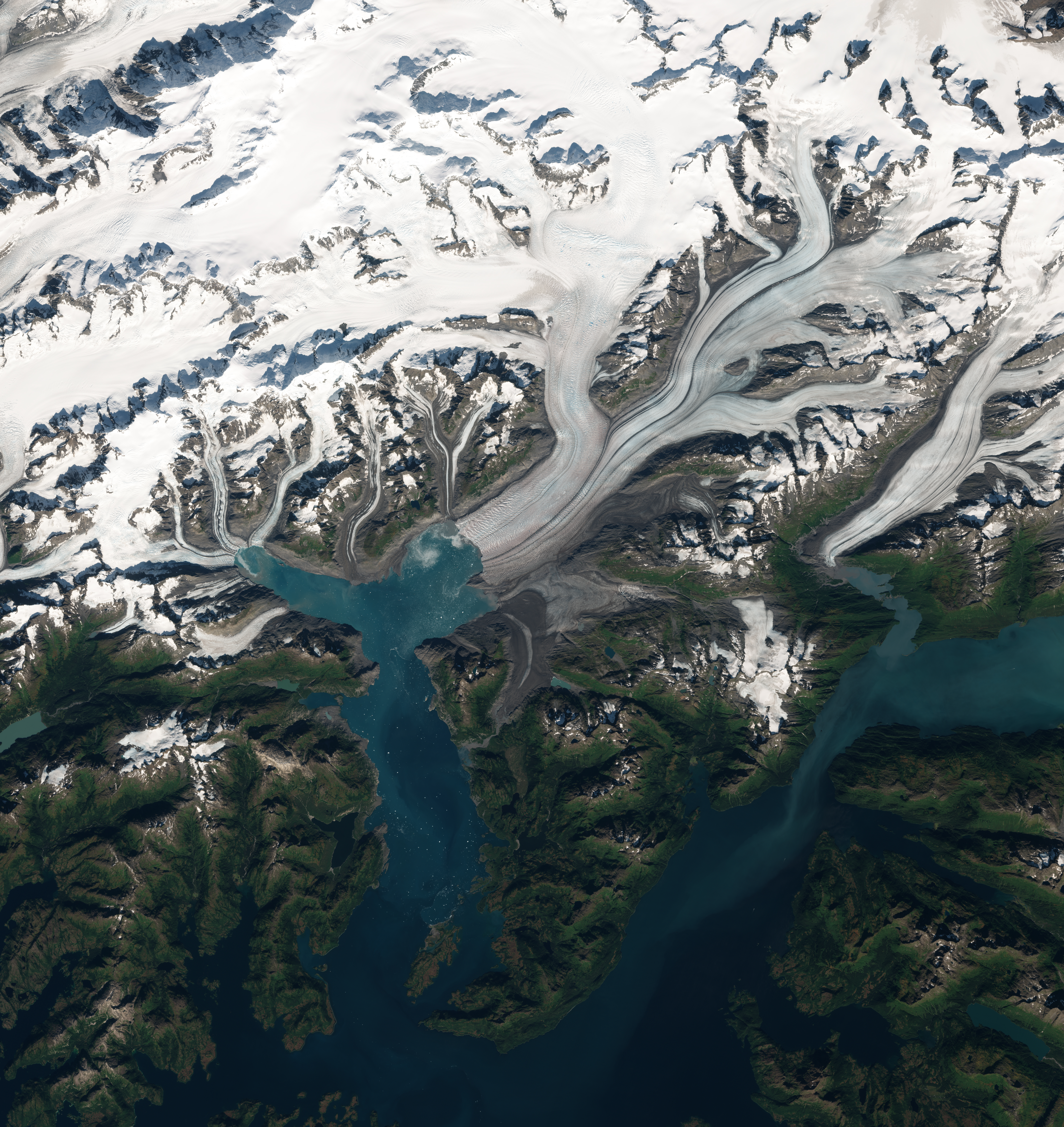
- Satellite image, September 2018

- Location within Alaska
- Interactive map of Columbia Glacier
- Type: Tidewater glacier
- Location: Descending from the Chugach Mountains to Prince William Sound, Alaska
- Coordinates: 61°13′11″N 146°53′43″W
- Area: 1,000 km^{2} (400 sq mi)
- Length: 51 kilometers (32 mi)
- Thickness: 550 m (1,800 ft)
- Terminus: Sealevel (Prince William Sound)
- Status: Retreating

The Columbia Glacier, a glacier in Prince William Sound on the south coast of the U.S. state of Alaska, is one of the fastest moving glaciers in the world, and has been retreating since the early 1980s. It was named after Columbia University, one of several glaciers in the area named for elite U.S. colleges by the Harriman Alaska Expedition in 1899. The head of the main branch of the glacier originates at the saddle between Mount Witherspoon and Mount Einstein.

The Alaska Marine Highway vessel M/V Columbia is named after the Columbia Glacier.

== Size ==
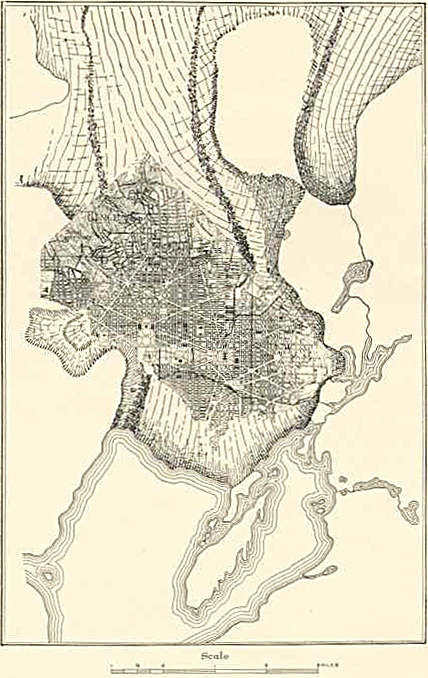
An illustration of Columbia Glacier in 1910, with the District of Columbia overlaid for scale comparisons

The glacier twists its way through western Alaska's Chugach Mountains. The bald streak at the bottom of the mountains, called the trimline, shows this glacier has lost 1,300 feet (400 m) of thickness. It has also retreated 10.5 miles (16.9 km) since that measurement was taken.

== Retreat ==
Satellites have observed Columbia Glacier, one of the fastest-changing glaciers in the world withdraw into the Chugach Mountain Range in south-central Alaska.

The glacier's speed of retreat at the terminus reached a maximum of nearly 30 meters (98 ft) per day in 2001, when it was discharging icebergs at approximately 7 cubic kilometers (1.7 cu mi) per year; the glacier has subsequently slowed down, resulting in an increase in retreat rate. The terminus has retreated a total of 16 km (9.9 mi) at an average rate of approximately 0.6 km (0.37 mi) per year since 1982. The retreat has been accompanied by nearly 500 m (1,600 ft) of thinning at the present position of the terminus. In the next few decades it is expected to retreat another 15 km (9.3 mi), to a point where the bed of the glacier rises above sea level. Columbia Glacier's retreat should be completed around 2020. Tidewater glacier advance and retreat is not directly forced by climate (adjacent tidewater glaciers may be simultaneously advancing and retreating), but rapid retreat appears to be triggered by climate-forced long-term thinning.

== Gallery ==
=== Glacier photographed in 1934 ===
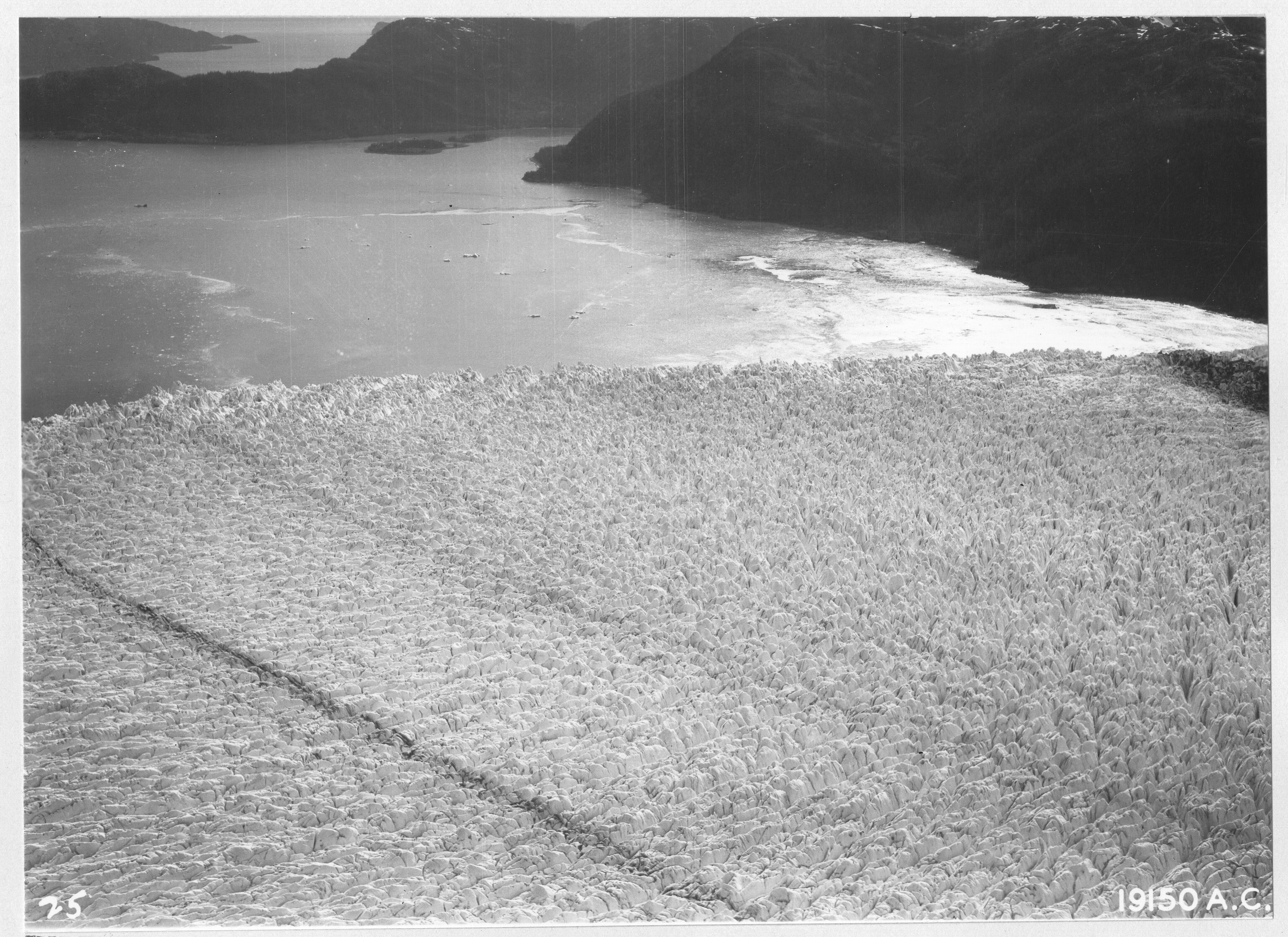

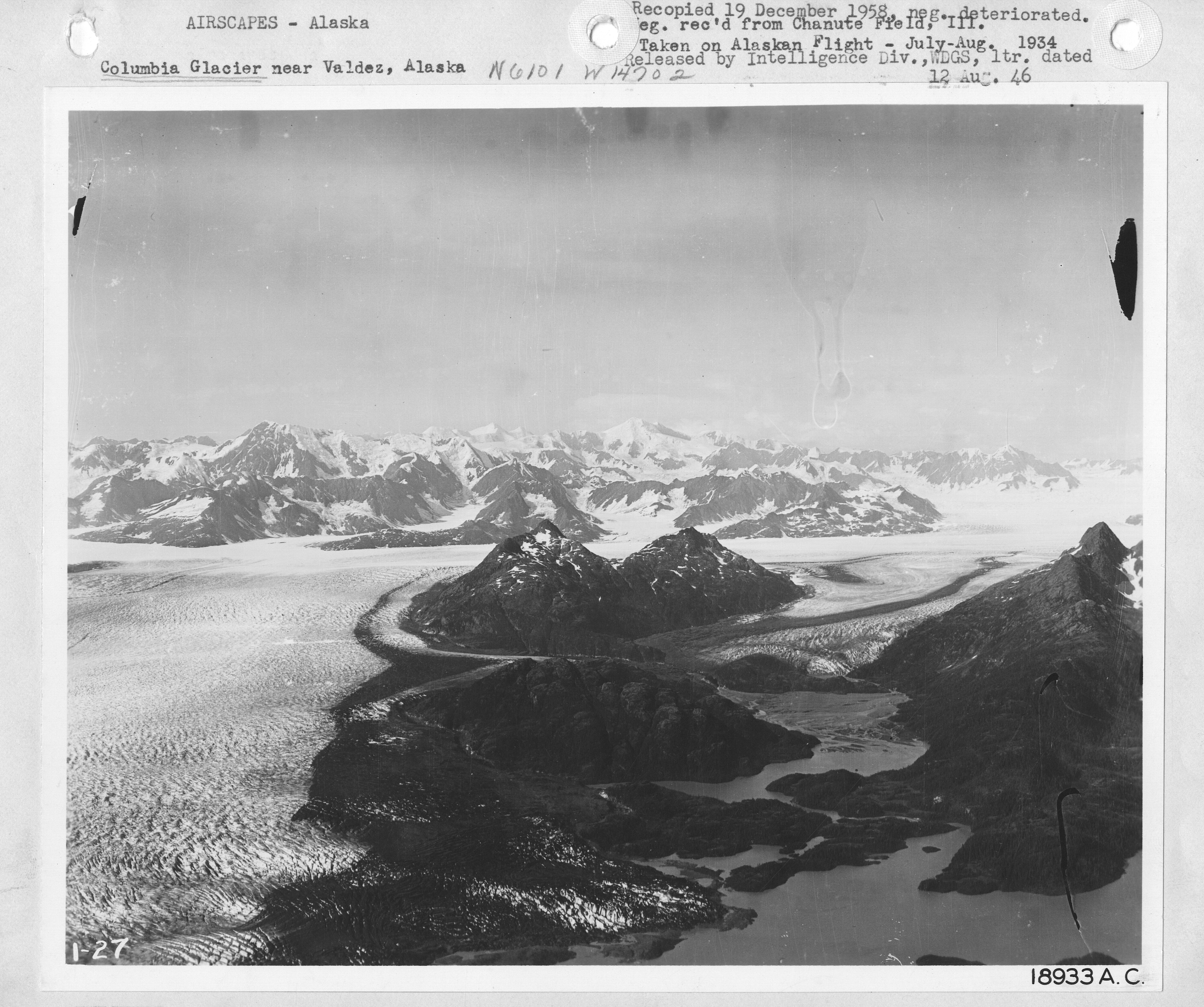

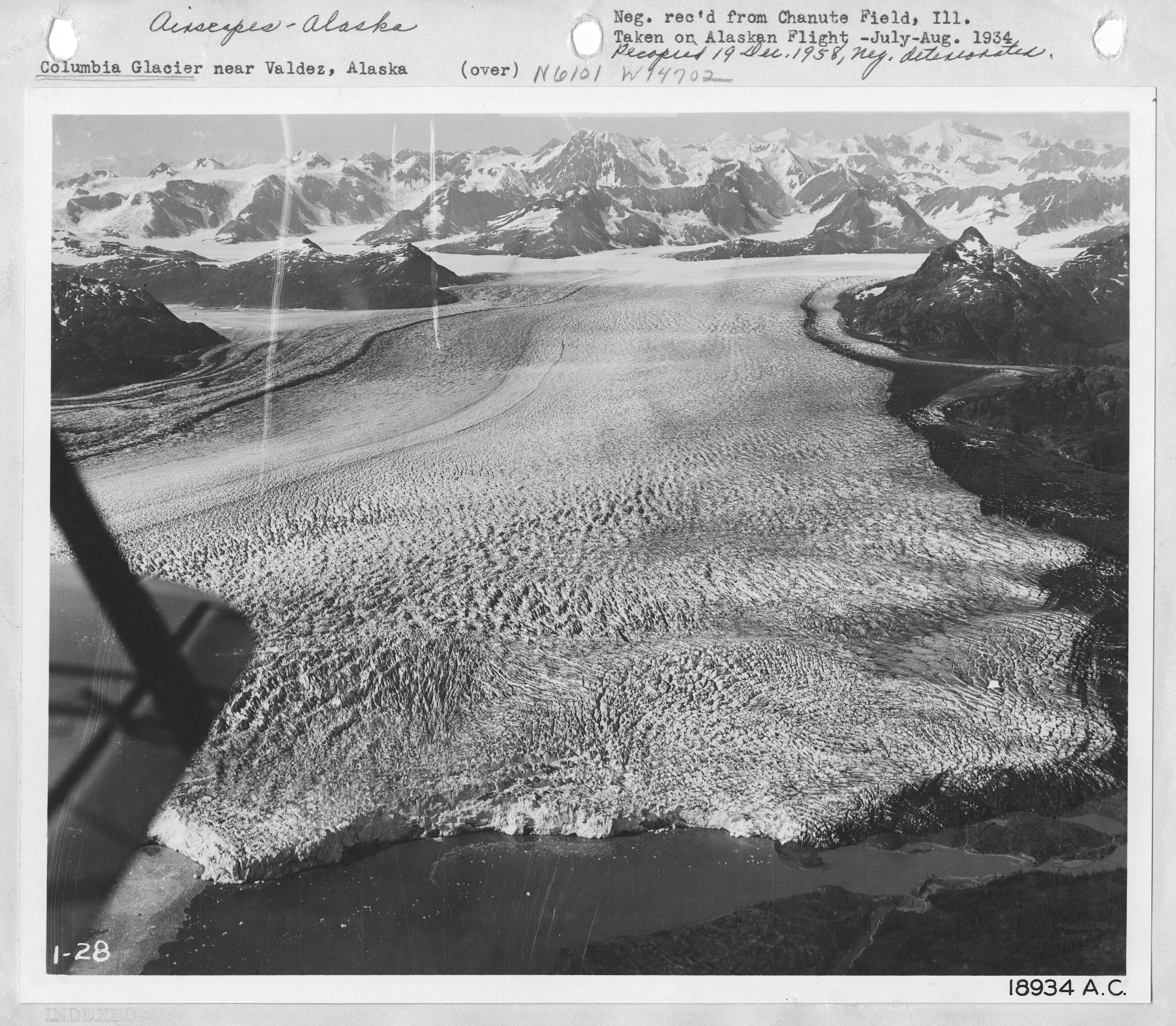

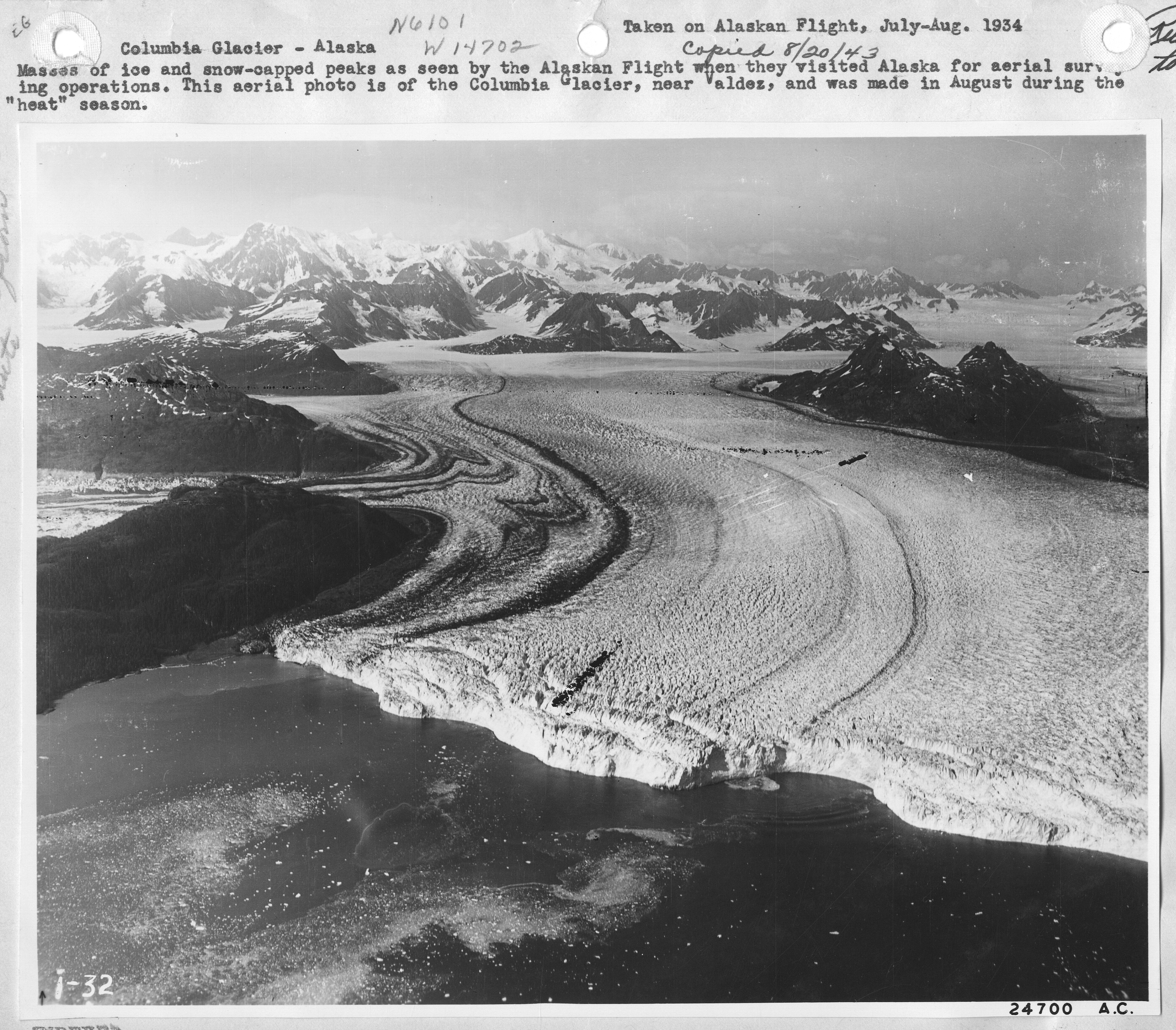

== See also ==
- Columbia Icefield
- List of glaciers
- Columbia Peak (Alaska)
