= Dora Keen =

American mountain climber (1871–1963)

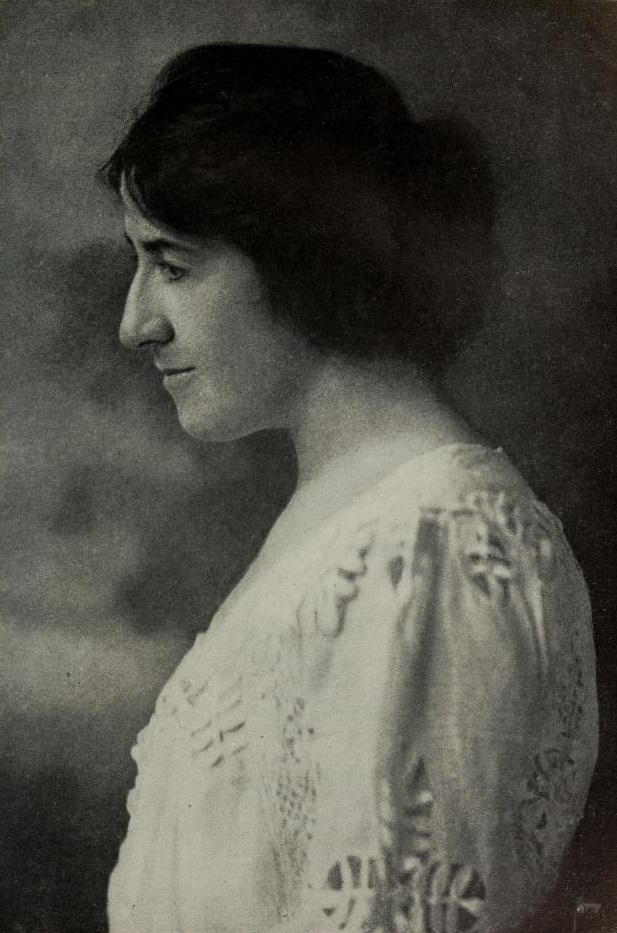
- Keen in 1913
- Born: June 24, 1871; Philadelphia, Pennsylvania
- Died: January 31, 1963 (aged 91); Hong Kong, China
- Education: Bryn Mawr College
- Known for: Mountaineering, adventuring, lecturing
- Spouse: George Handy
- Parent: William Williams Keen

Dora Keen (June 24, 1871 – January 31, 1963) was an American traveler, Alpinist, and social worker. She was the first person to reach the summit of Mount Blackburn and would subsequently write an article for The Saturday Evening Post titled "First up Mount Blackburn", along with becoming a fellow of the Royal Geographical Society.

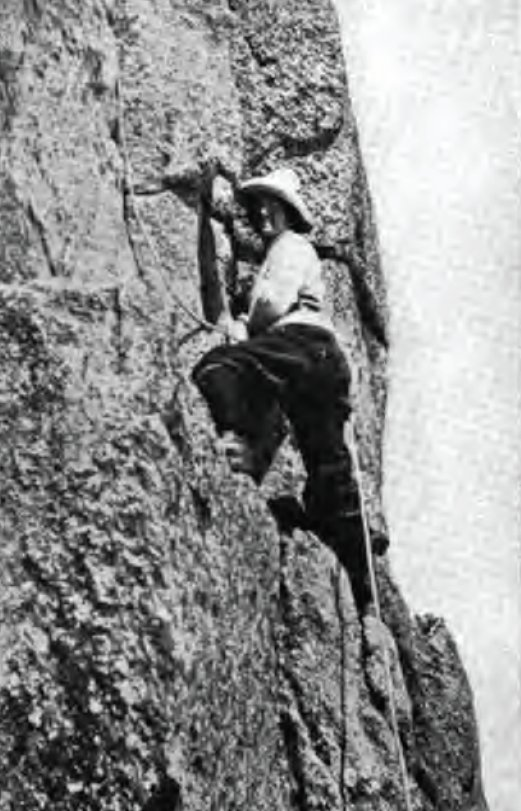
Keen climbing the Dent Du Requin in France, 1910

== Early life ==
She was born on June 24, 1871, in Philadelphia, a daughter of the surgeon William Williams Keen. After graduating from Bryn Mawr College in 1896, she held various positions in philanthropic organizations in Philadelphia, including the Society for the Prevention of Cruelty to Children, the American Society for Labor Legislation, and the Society for Organizing Charity, helping to bring about important reforms.

== Alpine climbing ==
In her travels Keen covered the North American continent from Alaska to Panama, both coasts of South America and the interior of the southern portion, eastern, western, and southern Asia and northern Africa; and she made numerous visits to Europe. Her activity as an Alpinist began with eight ascents of first-class peaks in the Alps in 1909–10. Starting with the opportunity to climb the Matterhorn, Keen traveled to Zermatt in the summer of 1909, where she climbed the Zinal Rothorn, the Monte Rosa, the Weisshorn, and the Matterhorn.

In the midsummer of 1911, she first attempted to climb Mount Blackburn (16,140 feet) (4919 m) in Alaska. The attempt was unsuccessful as she was inadequately equipped and the planning had been rushed. The expedition wasted 4½ days trying to climb two different glaciers at the mountain base, compared with a total expected climb time of 12 days. Each effort was abandoned as avalanches had rendered the glaciers impassable. Keen returned early in 1912, with only local prospectors for companions, and accomplished the first recorded ascent of the mountain on 19 May 1912. Out of 33 days which the party spent entirely on glaciers, for 20 they were without tents, sleeping in snow caves at low temperatures in extreme storms; and for 10 days they had only candles for fuel. Keen's summit is the first documented ascent of an Alaskan peak in history.

== Expeditions ==
This expedition was immediately followed by a journey of 300 miles (483 km) on foot and by open, camp-built boat across the Alaskan wilderness to the Yukon River; for 125 miles (201 km) the route lay over Skolai Pass, which Keen was the first woman ever to cross. In 1914, with three men, she made scientific observations of the glaciers of Harriman Fjord and College Fjord, Prince William Sound, Alaska, and made the first explorations of the Harvard Glacier, reaching its sources (6100 ft) (1859 m).

Keen contributed numerous articles to popular and geographical magazines and lectured on her experiences. She became a fellow of the Royal Geographical Society, London, in 1914.

== Personal ==
Keen married George Handy on July 8, 1916, in McCarthy, Alaska, within sight of Mount Blackburn. They settled in West Hartford, Vermont, and operated a farm. The couple divorced after 16 years of marriage. Following the divorce, Keen sold insurance products and continued to travel throughout the world.

== Death ==
In 1962, at age 91, Keen set out on a world tour, to include Alaska, where she had not been since 1916. She died in Hong Kong on January 31, 1963, while on the tour.
