= Harvard Glacier =

Glacier in Alaska

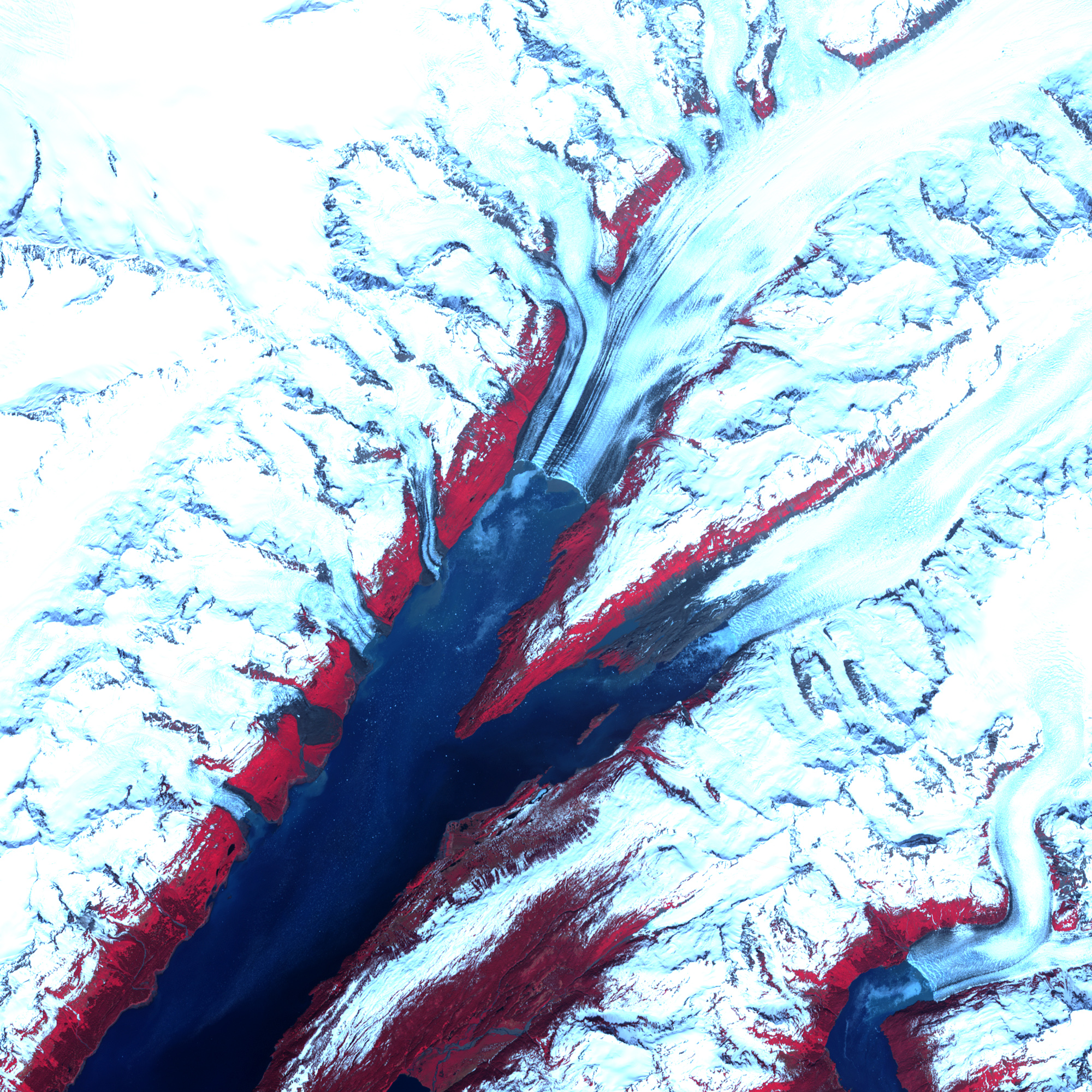
- Harvard Glacier is the large glacier at the head of College Fjord. You can see the wide medial moraines in this photo.

- Location within Alaska
- Interactive map of Harvard Glacier
- Type: Tidewater glacier
- Location: Matanuska-Susitna Borough and Valdez-Cordova Census Area, Alaska, U.S.
- Coordinates: 61°23′20″N 147°26′11″W
- Area: 120,000 acres (49,000 ha)
- Thickness: 300 ft (91 m)
- Terminus: Harvard Arm, College Fjord
- Status: Advancing

The Harvard Glacier is a large tidewater glacier in the Alaska's Prince William Sound. The glacier has a 1.5-mile (2 km) wide face where it calves into the College Fjord. It is 300 ft thick and covers 120,000 acres of Chugach National Forest. The Harvard Glacier is the second largest glacier in the Prince William Sound, after the Columbia Glacier. It is a popular destination of cruise ships in the Prince William Sound.

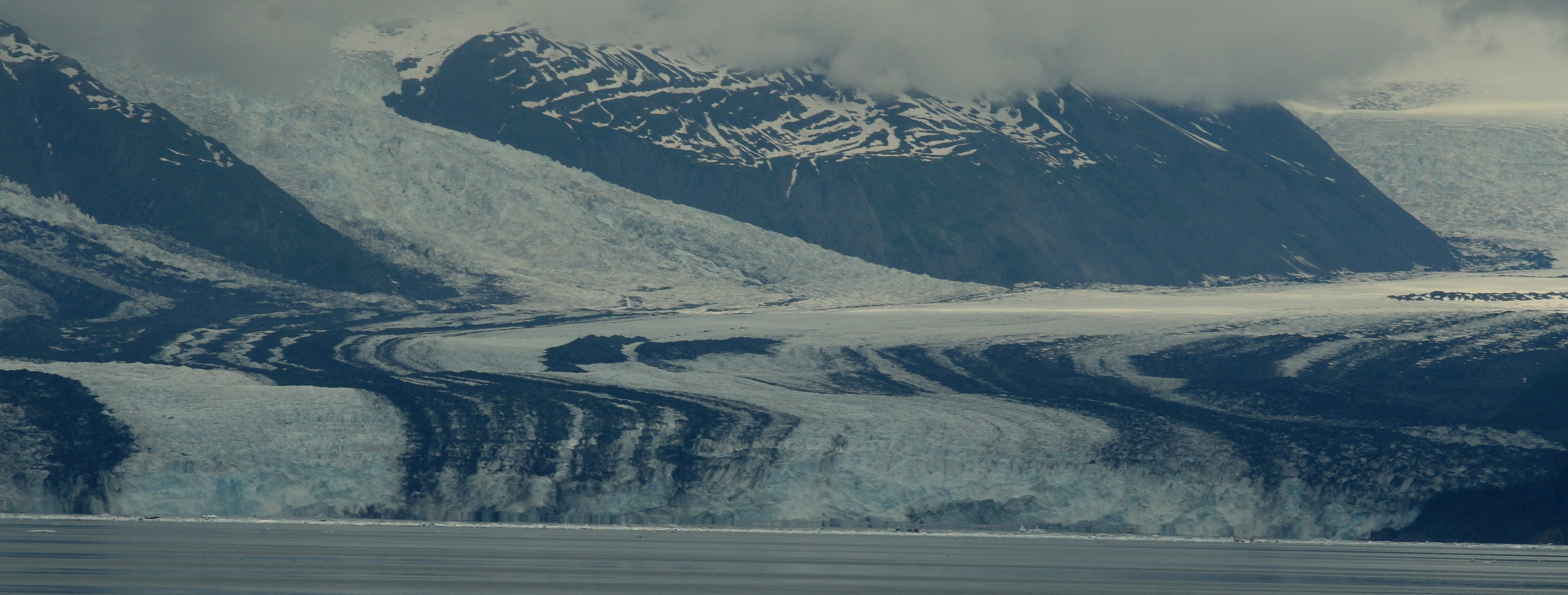
Harvard Glacier

== See also ==
- List of glaciers
