= College Fjord =

Fjord in Alaska

Coordinates: 61°06′32″N 147°55′16″W

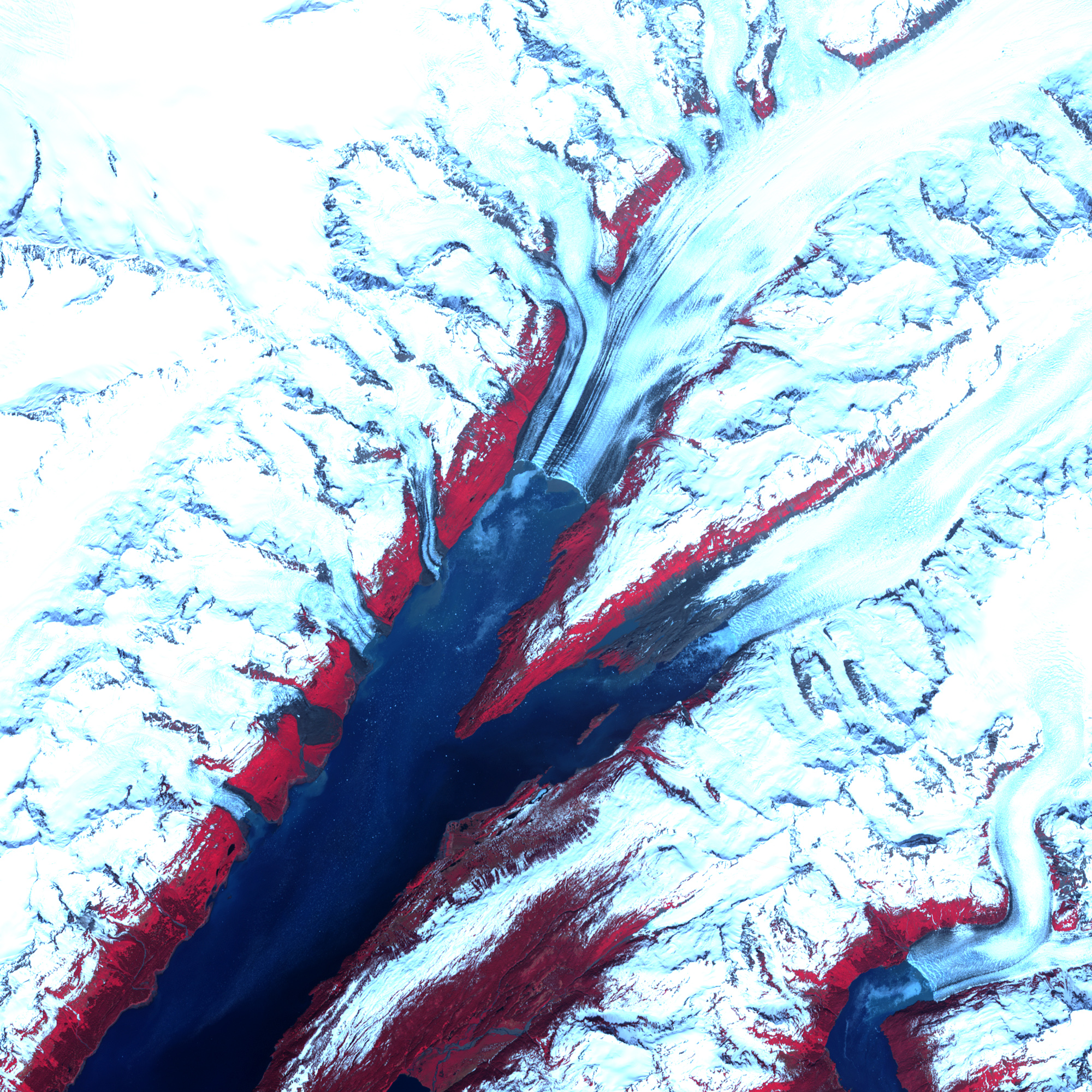
Infrared-enhanced image of College Fjord. Snow appears white, glaciers appear bright blue, and land surfaces with vegetation on them appear red. Although the two-dimensional image makes it appear that the glaciers along the western side of the fjord simply fill in great ravines, in reality, the glaciers tumble down toward the water over steep hillsides like frozen waterfalls.

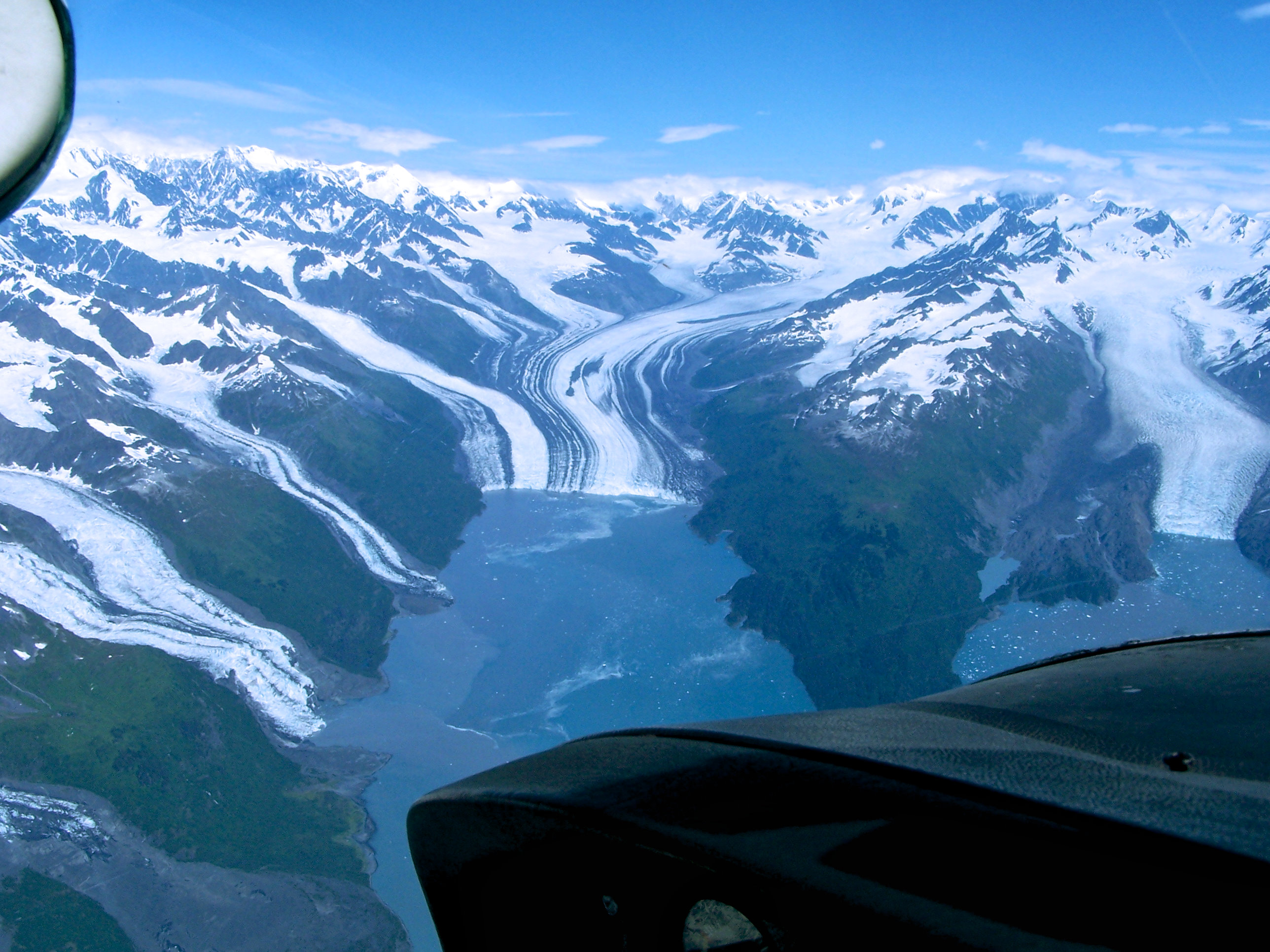
College Fjord, Alaska, from the air looking East: on north (left) snouts of Vassar, Bryn Mawr, and Smith Glaciers; at east end (mid photo) Harvard; southeast (right edge) Yale; Downer should be south edge of Harvard but it is not easily seen here.

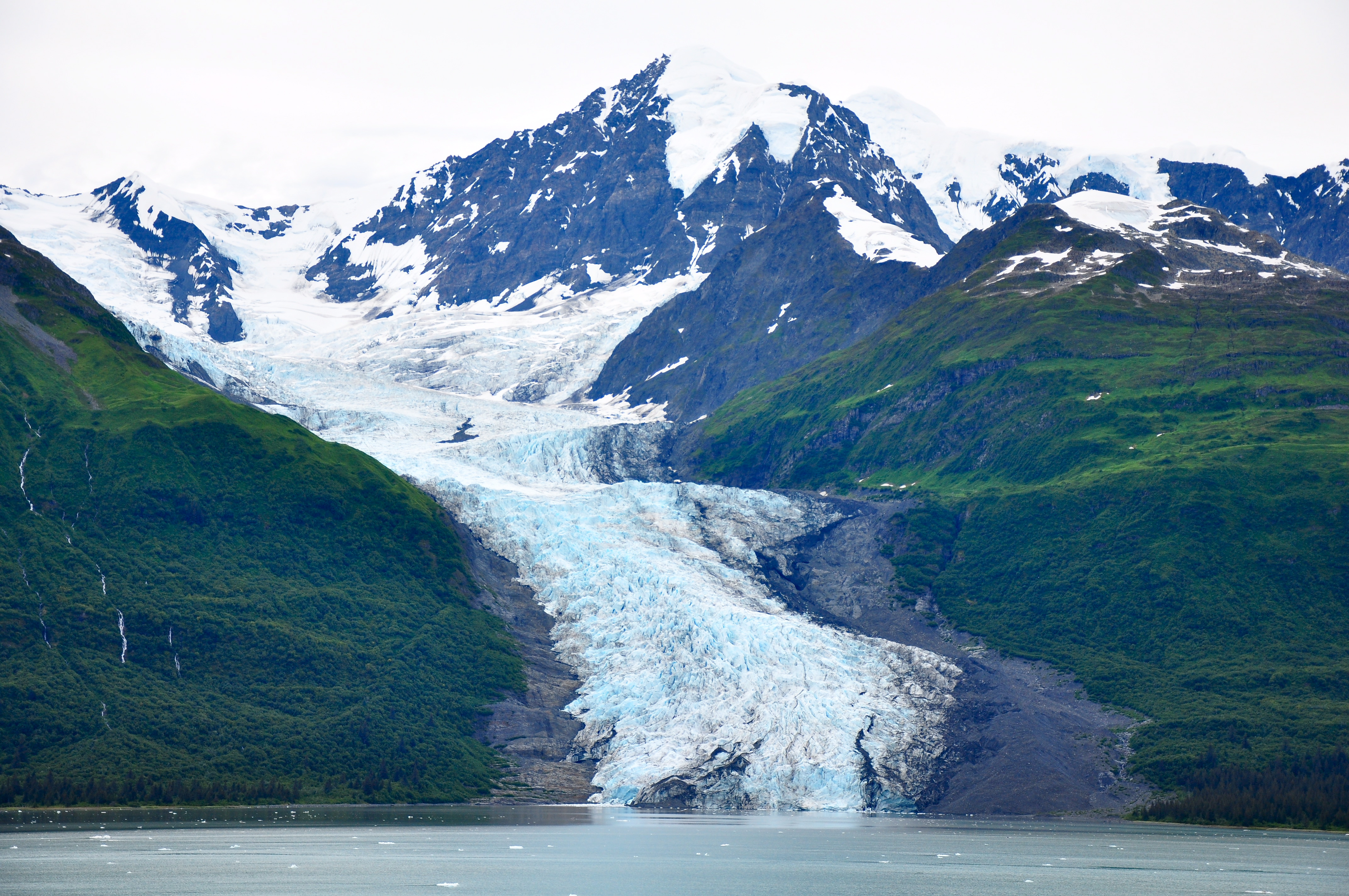

College Fjord is a fjord located in the northern sector of Prince William Sound in the U.S. state of Alaska. The fjord contains five tidewater glaciers (glaciers that terminate in water), five large valley glaciers, and dozens of smaller glaciers, most named after renowned East Coast colleges (women's colleges for the NW side, and men's colleges for the SE side). College Fjord was discovered in 1899 during the Harriman Expedition, at which time the glaciers were named. The expedition included a Harvard and an Amherst professor, and they named many of the glaciers after elite colleges. According to Bruce Molina, author of Alaska's Glaciers, "They took great delight in ignoring Princeton."

== Incomplete list of College Fjord glaciers ==
- Amherst Glacier
- Baby Glacier
- Barnard Glacier
- Bryn Mawr Glacier
- Crescent Glacier
- Downer Glacier
- Harvard Glacier
- Holyoke Glacier
- Smith Glacier
- Vassar Glacier
- Wellesley Glacier
- Williams Glacier
- Yale Glacier

== Glaciers near College Fjord ==
These glaciers were also named by members of the Harriman Alaska Expedition (see map at https://www-tc.pbs.org/harriman/images/log/lectures/crossengl/barrymap_lg.jpg), but they don't border College Fjord:

- Columbia Glacier (Alaska)
- Dartmouth Glacier
- Barry Glacier
- Surprise Glacier
- Harriman Glacier
- Serpentine Glacier
- Cataract Glacier
