= Downer =

Downer may refer to:

- Downer (surname), various persons of that name
- Downer, Australian Capital Territory, a suburb of Canberra, Australia
- Downer Glacier, Alaska
- Downer, Minnesota, an unincorporated community
- Downer (soil), the New Jersey state soil
- Downer (animal), a livestock animal that is to be killed because it cannot stand
- "Downer" (song), on the grunge band Nirvana's debut album Bleach
- Downer, a hard rock band that released an album on Roadrunner Records in 2001.
- Downers, slang for depressant drugs
- Downer Group, an Australian company
- Downer Rail, an Australian railroad company
- Downer College, a former women's college in Fox Lake, Wisconsin
- Downer Methodist Episcopal Church, in Monroe Township, New Jersey, on the National Register of Historic Places
- Downer Rowhouses, two sets of row houses in Somerville, Massachusetts, both on the National Register of Historic Places
- Downers Grove, Illinois, a village and township
