= University Peak (Alaska) =

Mountain in Alaska, United States

- University Peak

Highest point
- Elevation: 14,470 ft (4,410 m); NAVD88
- Prominence: 3,210 ft (980 m)
- Isolation: 3.71 mi (5.97 km)
- Listing: North America highest peaks 26th; US highest major peaks 13th; Alaska highest major peaks 12th
- Coordinates: 61°19′38″N 141°47′07″W

Geography
- Location: Wrangell-St. Elias National Park and Preserve, Alaska, U.S.
- Parent range: Saint Elias Mountains
- Topo map: USGS McCarthy B-3 Quadrangle

Climbing
- First ascent: June 19, 1955 by Keith Hart, Leon Blumer, Sheldon Brooks, Tim Kelly, Norman Sanders, Gibson Reynolds, R. Houston
- Easiest route: snow/ice climb

University Peak is a high peak in the Saint Elias Mountains of Alaska. It is one of the twenty highest peaks in Alaska , and one of the fifty highest peaks in the United States. It can be considered a southern outlier of the large massif of Mount Bona. However, it is a much steeper peak than Bona, and presents significant climbing challenges of its own.

The peak was named by Terris Moore during the first ascent of Mount Bona; the name refers to the University of Alaska.

== Climbing ==
The first ascent of University Peak was in 1955, via the North Ridge. The leader was Keith Hart, University of Alaska. The party consisted of Gibson Reynolds, Columbia University, Leon Blumer, Sydney, Australia, Tim Kelley, University of Washington, Sheldon Brooks, Pacific Lutheran College and Norman Sanders, University of Alaska. The climbers started at the foot of the Hawkins Glacier, and negotiated a difficult icefall to gain a basin at around 10,000 feet (3,000 m) elevation, on the west side of the North Ridge. This is still the recommended easiest route, but now one can fly into the 10,000-foot (3,000 m) basin to avoid the icefall. This route is rated Alaska Grade 2+.

A much harder route (Alaska Grade 5) was climbed on the East Face of the peak (from the Barnard Glacier) in 1997, by Carlos Buhler and Charlie Sassara.

This East Face route, named "Third Semester", involves 8,500 feet (2,600 m) of 50-80 degree snow, ice and rock capped with a 300-foot (90 m) vertical ice cliff. The descent is via the North Ridge. The first ascent party, Charles Sassara and Carlos Buhler, took 6 days to complete the traverse, including 2 days of storm that prevented movement.

== Geology ==
University Peak consists mainly of an eroded subvolcanic granodioritic intrusion that formed approximately 8.4 million years ago.

== See also ==
- List of mountain peaks of North America
  - List of mountain peaks of the United States
    - List of mountain peaks of Alaska

== Bibliography ==
- Michael Wood, Colby Coombs, Alaska: A Climbing Guide, The Mountaineers, 2001.
