= Cape Fox (disambiguation) =

Cape Fox may refer to:

- the Cape fox, a species of fox in South Africa
- Cape Fox (Alaska), a cape in the Alaska Panhandle near Prince Rupert, British Columbia
- Cape Fox (Ketchikan), a cape in the Ketchikan Gateway area of the Alaska Panhandle
  - Cape Fox Village, a historical village of the Tlingit near Cape Fox, Ketchikan Gateway
  - Cape Fox people, a.k.a. the Cape Fox tribe, a name for the Sanyaa Kwáan or Southward Tribe of the Tlingit
- Fox Cape, a cape in the Eastern Aleutians
- Cape Lises, in the Western Aleutians, from the Russian lisa for "fox", is also known as Fox Cape

Vessels named Cape Fox:

- CCGS Cape Fox, a Canadian Coast Guard search and rescue lifeboat
- USCGC Cape Fox was a United States Coast Guard Cape-class cutter
