= Magsig Rampart =

Rock formation in Antarctica

Magsig Rampart (85°54′00″S 142°00′00″W) is an outcropping of rock forming a buttress or rampart on the west flank of the Stanford Plateau along the Watson Escarpment in Antarctica. The buttress rises about 400 metres (1,300 ft) above the east side of Leverett Glacier near the glacier head. It was named by the Advisory Committee on Antarctic Names in 2006 after Russell Magsig, a mechanic with the Siple Station winter party, 1983, who worked for 16 summer seasons at Williams Field, the South Pole Station and McMurdo Station, including participation on the United States Antarctic Program South Pole Traverse Project between 2002 and 2005.
