= Holyoke Glacier =

Glacier in Alaska, United States

- Location within Alaska
- Interactive map of Holyoke Glacier
- Type: glacier
- Location: College Fjord, Alaska, U.S.
- Coordinates: 61°09′40″N 147°57′28″W
- Length: 1.5 miles (2.4 km)
- Highest elevation: 3,655 ft (1,114 m)

Holyoke Glacier is a 1.5-mile-long (2.4 km) glacier in the U.S. state of Alaska. It trends southeast on the west bank of College Fjord, 6.8 mi (10.9 km) southwest of College Point and 65 mi (105 km) east of Anchorage. It was named by U.S. Grant and D.F. Higgins, USGS, in 1908. It was named for Mount Holyoke College in South Hadley, Massachusetts.

== Geography ==
Holyoke Glacier, which heads in a large cirque and is fed by two glaciers from a small cirque on the south, has two weak medial moraines extending from spurs between its south tributaries. There are no lateral moraines, but there are a few morainic patches along the terminus. The glacier is longer than Barnard Glacier, and extends out over the lip of its hanging valley. In 1910, the glacier nowhere extended to the borders of its barren zone, and the mature spruce forest between the small terminal barren zone and the fiord demonstrates that it has not extended beyond this barren zone for a century or more. No distinct signs of recent advance were seen. The cliff glaciers on the ledges south of Holyoke Glacier present no unusual features.

== See also ==
- List of glaciers
