= Bryn Mawr Glacier =

Glacier in Alaska, United States

- Location within Alaska
- Interactive map of Bryn Mawr Glacier
- Type: glacier
- Location: College Fjord, Alaska, U.S.
- Coordinates: 61°15′13″N 147°49′29″W
- Length: 4.5 miles (7.2 km)
- Terminus: 2,972 ft (906 m)

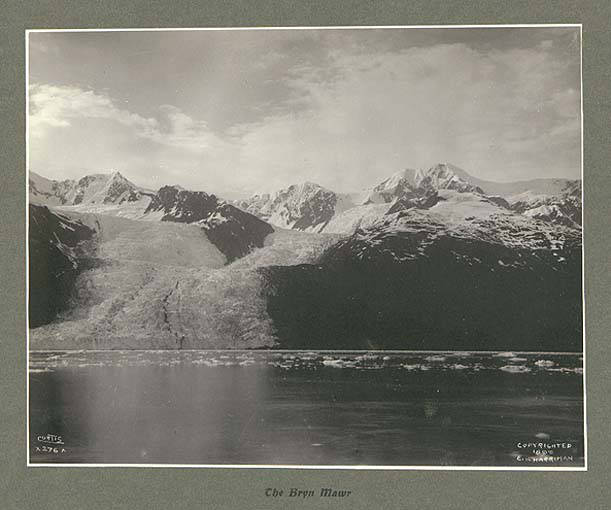
Bryn Mawr Glacier (Alaska) 1899

Bryn Mawr Glacier is a 4.5-mile-long (7.2 km) glacier in the U.S. state of Alaska. It trends southeast to Harvard Arm of College Fjord, 2 miles (3.2 km) northwest of College Point and 52 miles (84 km) west of Valdez. It was named for Bryn Mawr College in Bryn Mawr, Pennsylvania by members of the 1899 Harriman Alaska Expedition.

== See also ==
- List of glaciers
