= Wellesley Glacier =

Glacier in the United States

- Location within Alaska
- Interactive map of Wellesley Glacier
- Type: glacier
- Location: College Fjord, Alaska, U.S.
- Coordinates: 61°11′55″N 147°55′12″W
- Length: 4 m (13 ft)

Wellesley Glacier is a 4-mile (6.4 km) long glacier in the U.S. state of Alaska. It trends east for 4 mi (6.4 km) to a lagoon on the west bank of College Fjord, 3.7 mi (6.0 km) southwest of College Point and 54 mi (87 km) west of Valdez. It was named for Wellesley College in Wellesley, Massachusetts by members of the 1899 Harriman Alaska Expedition.

== See also ==
- List of glaciers
