= Cape Fox Village =

Ghost town in Alaska, United States

Coordinates: 55°00′30″N 131°00′15″W

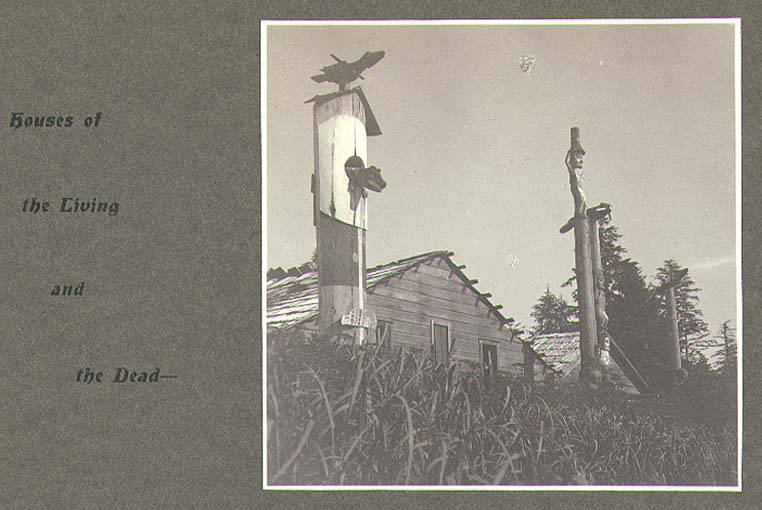
Two totem poles, one with man holding hat, in front of dwellings, Tlingit Indian village, Cape Fox, Alaska, July 1899

Cape Fox Village is a locality in Southeast Alaska near present-day Ketchikan. It is the site of a former village called Gaash of the Cape Fox people (Saanyaa Ḵwáan) of the Tlingit.

The location of the village is on the east side of Revillagigedo Channel, four miles south of Boca de Quadra. The name was recorded in 1880 by Ivan Petroff during the 10th Census, who reported 100 Tlingit still living there.

== Abandonment ==
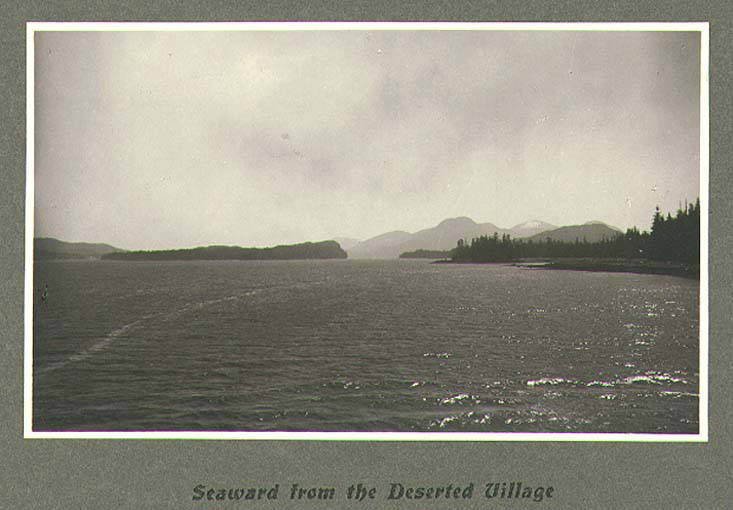
View seaward from Tlingit Indian village, Cape Fox, Alaska, July 1899

The Tlingit people of Cape Fox left the village and moved to Saxman, Alaska, in 1894. Reasons for the exodus may have been disease and that the Tlingit wanted access to schools and the Presbyterian church. They became the Organized Village of Saxman.

== Looting ==
During the Harriman Expedition of Alaska that took place in 1899 several Native artifacts that were important to the neighboring populations of Cape Fox were removed and relocated to several academic institutions across the United States, including the Field Museum in Chicago, and Cornell University. The expedition saw the artifacts as inanimate objects from a deserted village. To the Tlingit living nearby, the artifacts were a sacred part of their identity. This event is referred as the "Looting of Cape Fox."

Since the looting, several artifacts have been returned to Tlingit communities near Cape Fox in an effort to return stolen artifacts to the descendants of who created them.

== See also ==
- Cape Fox (disambiguation)
- Tongass Island
