= Amherst Glacier =

Glacier in Alaska, United States

- Location within Alaska
- Interactive map of Amherst Glacier
- Type: glacier
- Location: College Fjord, Alaska, U.S.
- Coordinates: 61°00′56″N 147°51′20″W
- Length: 4 miles (6.4 km)
- Highest elevation: 1,355 ft (413 m)

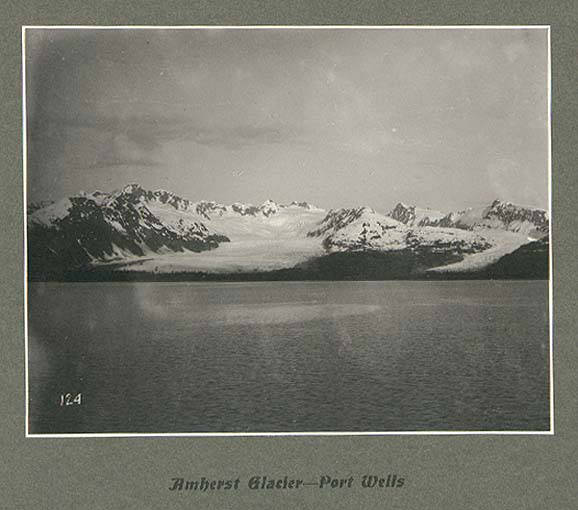
Amherst Glacier, left, and Crescent Glacier, right, on the northwestern arm of Prince William Sound called Port Wells, Alaska

Amherst Glacier is a 4-mile-long (6.4 km) glacier in the U.S. state of Alaska. It trends northwest to a lake, 5.5 mi (8.9 km) northeast of Point Pakenham and 52 mi (84 km) southwest of Valdez. It was named for Amherst College in Amherst, Massachusetts by members of the 1899 Harriman Alaska Expedition.

== See also ==
- List of glaciers
