= Smith Glacier (Alaska) =

Glacier in the United States

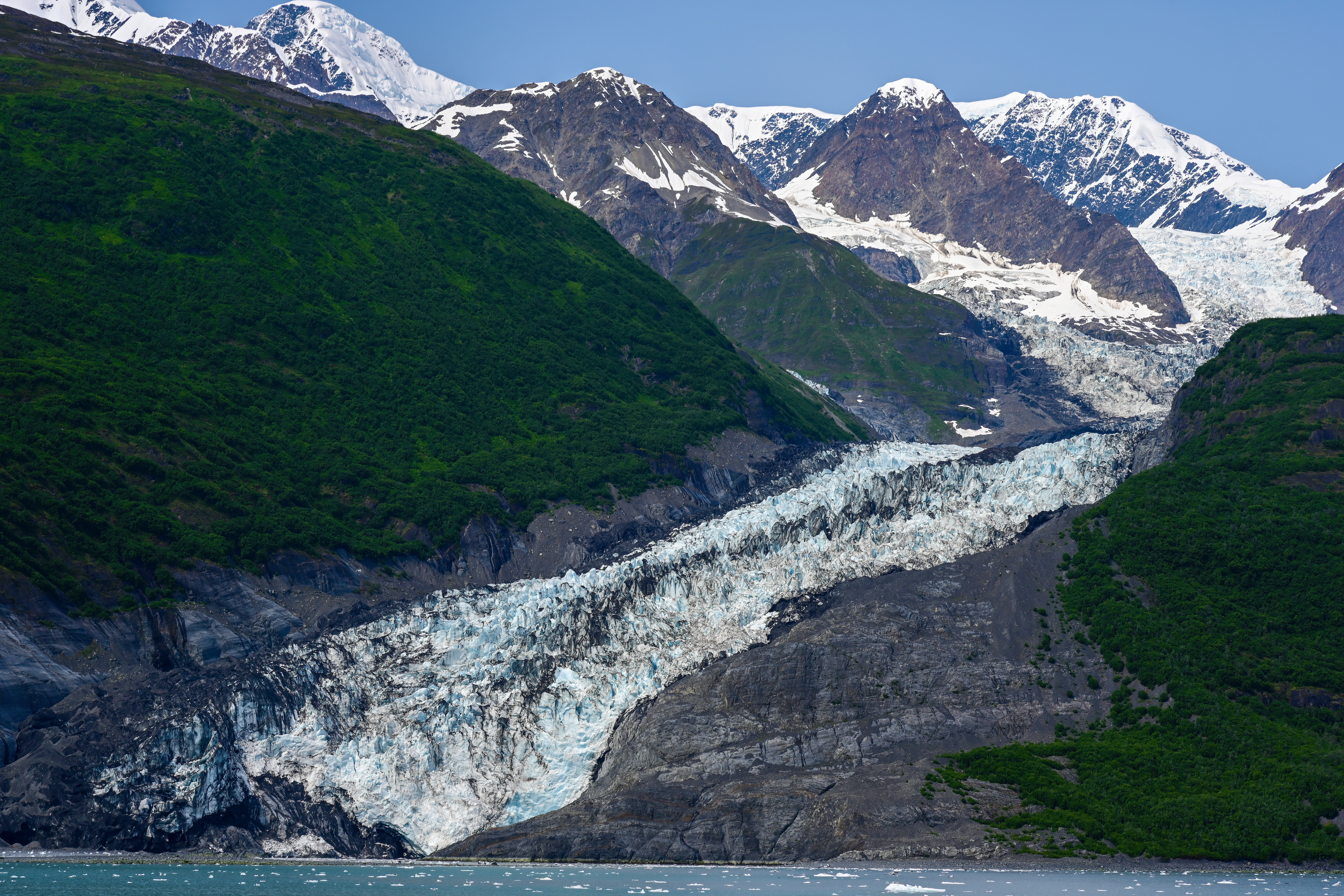

- Location within Alaska
- Interactive map of Smith Glacier
- Type: glacier
- Location: College Fjord, Alaska, U.S.
- Coordinates: 61°16′26″N 147°46′49″W
- Length: 5.5 m (18 ft)
- Terminus: 2201 ft (671 m)

Smith Glacier is a 5.5-mile (8.9 km) long glacier in the U.S. state of Alaska. It trends southeast to Harvard Arm of College Fjord, 2.8 miles (4.5 km) northwest of College Point and 51 miles (82 km) west of Valdez. It was named for Smith College in Northampton, Massachusetts by members of the 1899 Harriman Alaska Expedition.

== See also ==
- List of glaciers
