= Vassar Glacier =

Glacier in Alaska, United States

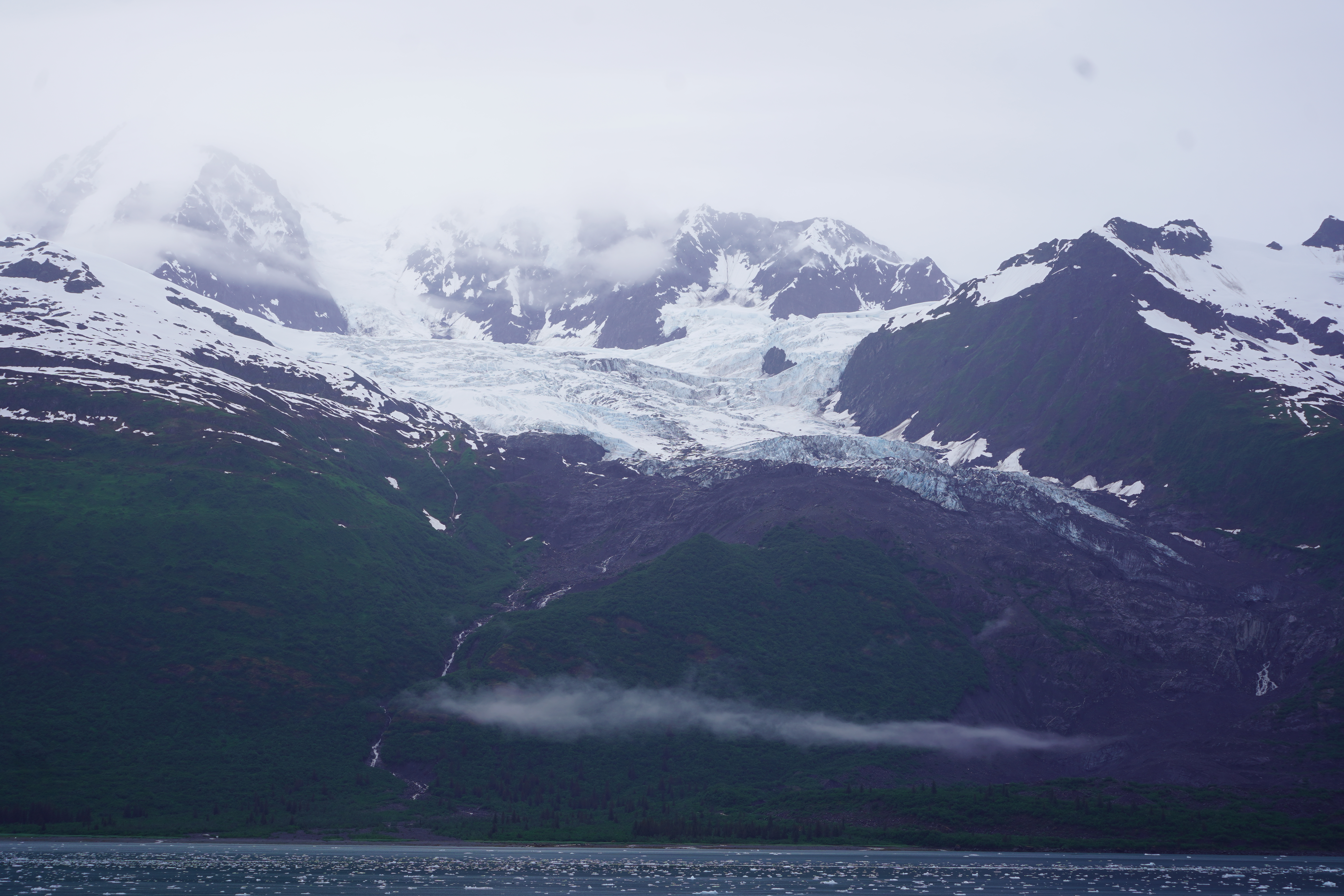
- Vassar Glacier in 2024

- Location within Alaska
- Interactive map of Vassar Glacier
- Location: College Fjord, Alaska, U.S.
- Coordinates: 61°12′55″N 147°51′56″W
- Length: 4.3 m (14 ft)
- Lowest elevation: 2,654 ft (809 m)

Vassar Glacier is a 4.3-mile (6.9 km) long glacier in the U.S. state of Alaska. It trends southeast to College Fjord, 2 mi (3.2 km) west of College Point and 52 mi (84 km) west of Valdez. It was named for Vassar College in Poughkeepsie, New York, by members of the 1899 Harriman Alaska Expedition.

== See also ==
- List of glaciers
