= Crescent Glacier =

Crescent Glacier may refer to:

- Crescent Glacier (Antarctica)
- Crescent Glacier (Alaska)
- Crescent Glacier (Mount Adams), Washington
