= Williams Glacier =

Glacier in Alaska, United States

- Location within Alaska
- Interactive map of Williams Glacier
- Type: glacier
- Location: College Fjord, Alaska, U.S.
- Coordinates: 61°03′37″N 147°45′49″W
- Length: 1.2 m (3 ft 11 in)
- Lowest elevation: 2,172 ft (662 m)

Williams Glacier is a 1.2-mile (1.9 km) long glacier in the U.S. state of Alaska. It trends northwest to its terminus 4.5 mi (7.2 km) east of College Point and 50 mi (80 km) west of Valdez. The name was reported in 1908 by Grant and Higgins (1910, pl. 2), USGS. It was named for Williams College in Williamstown, Massachusetts.

== See also ==
- List of glaciers
