= Saxman Totem Park =

- U.S. National Register of Historic Places
- U.S. Historic district
- Alaska Heritage Resources Survey
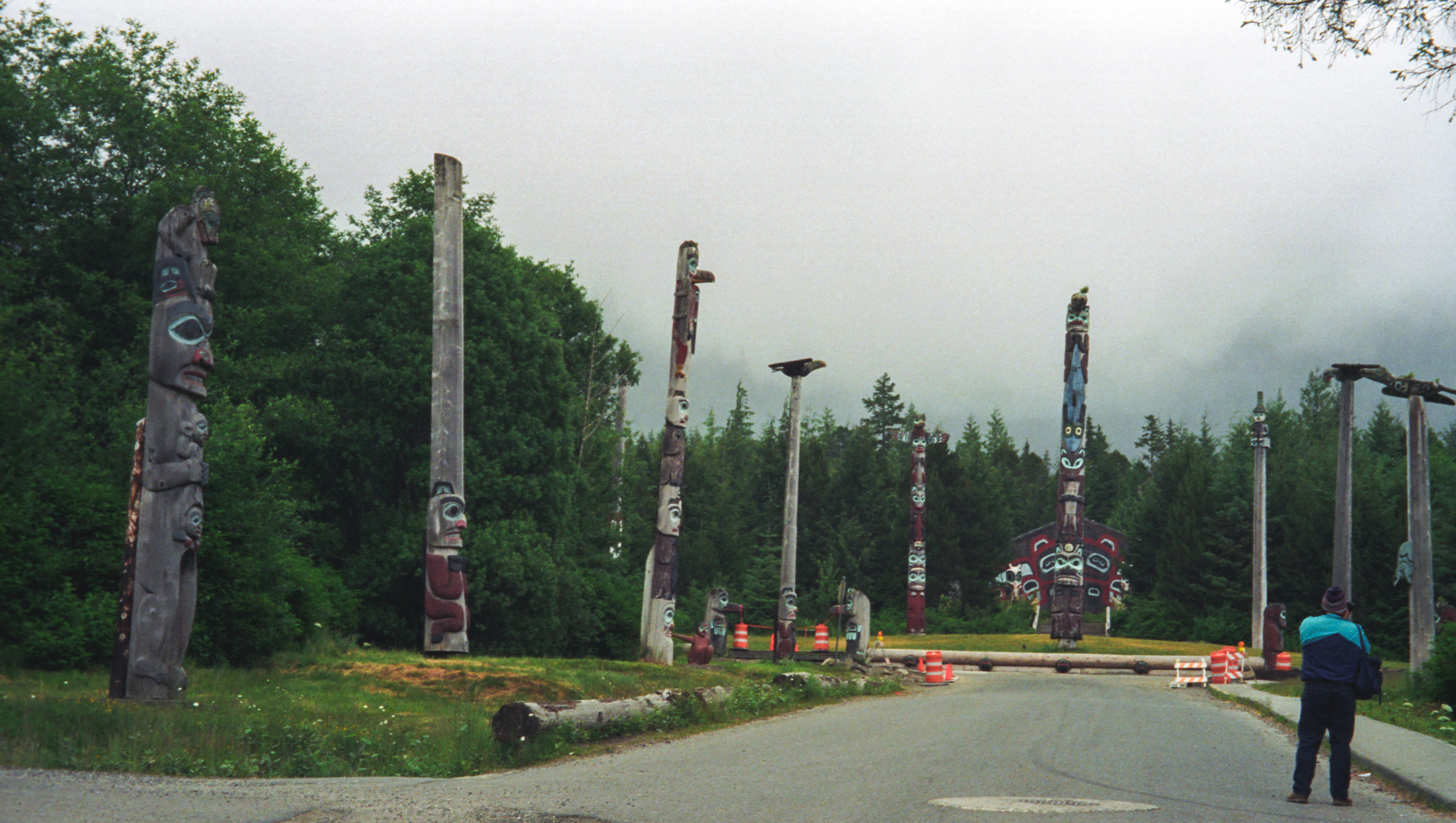

- Location within Alaska
- Location: 2660 Killer Whale Avenue, Saxman, Alaska
- Coordinates: 55°19′11″N 131°35′47″W
- Area: 5 acres (2.0 ha)
- Built: 1939
- NRHP reference No.: 79003758
- AHRS No.: KET-060

Significant dates
- Added to NRHP: August 7, 1979
- Designated AHRS: March 9, 1977

Saxman Totem Park is a public park in the city of Saxman, Alaska, just south of Ketchikan in southeastern Alaska. The park is home to a collection of totem poles, some of which are old poles relocated to this place from unoccupied Tlingit villages in the region, or were reconstructed by skilled Tlingit carvers under the auspices of the Civilian Conservation Corps in the 1930s. The poles originated in the communities of Old Tongass, Cat Island, Village Island, Pennock Island, and Fox Village. One of the carved items recovered from unoccupied villages is a marble statue of a grizzly bear. The park was listed on the National Register of Historic Places in 1979.

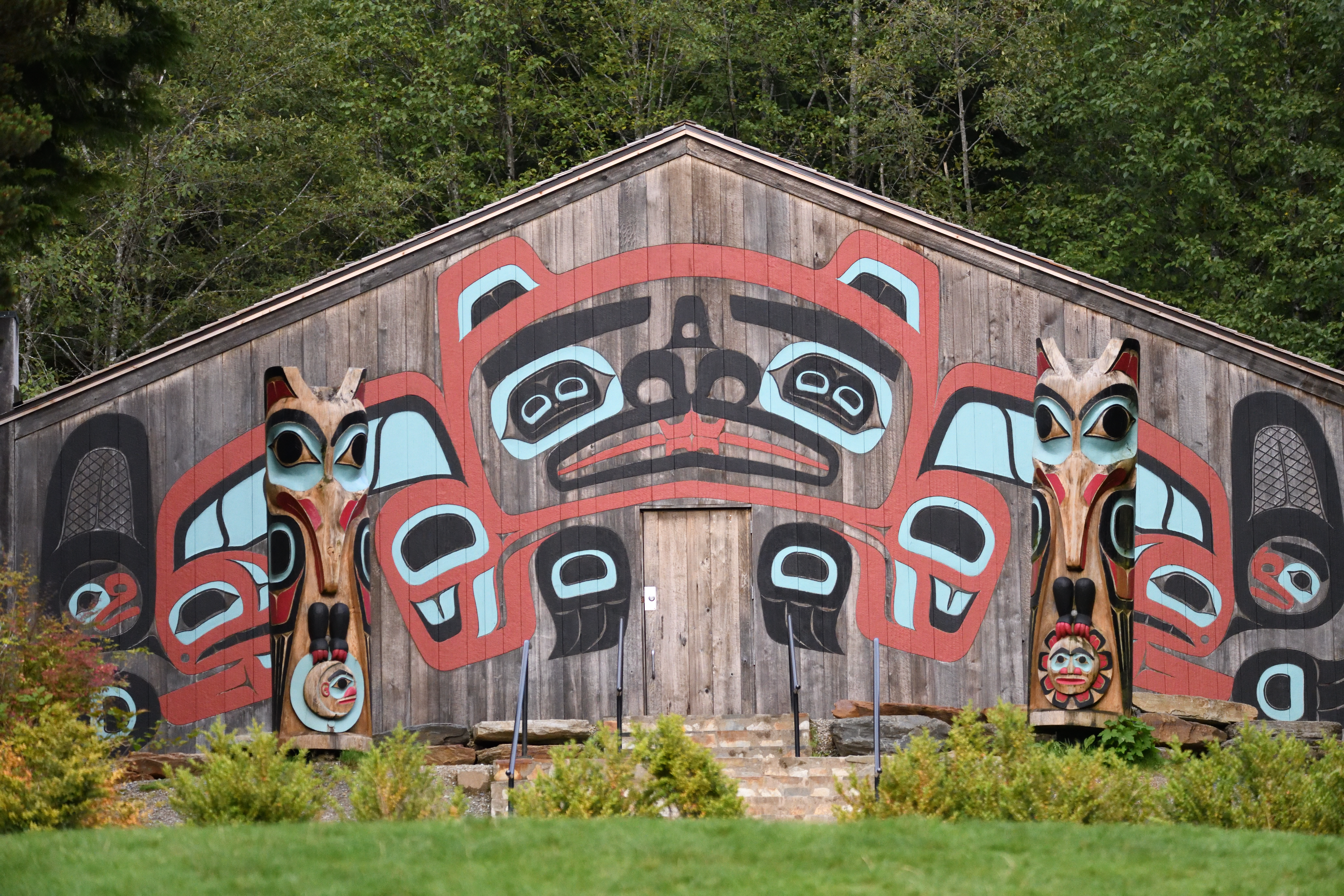
Clan House at Saxman

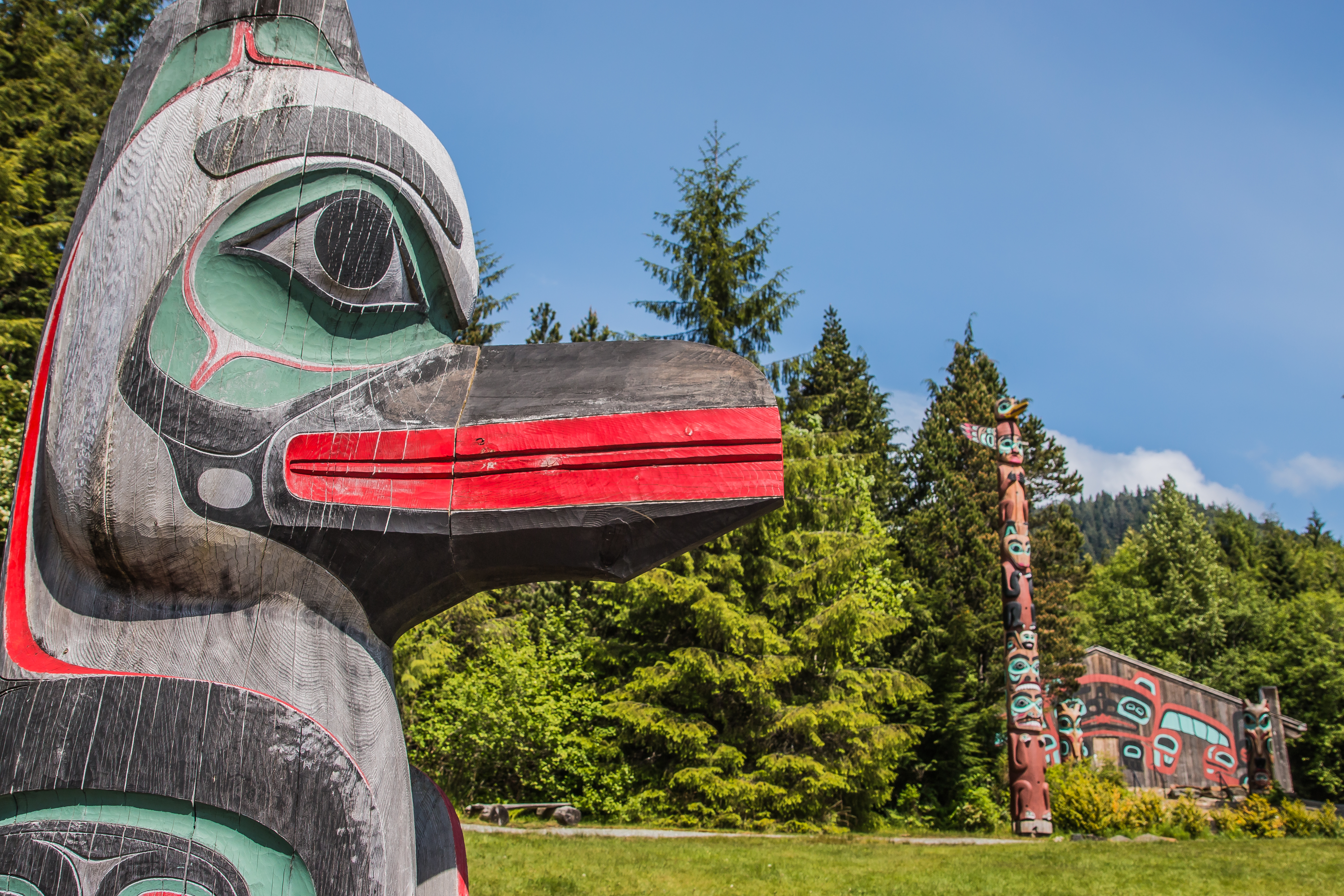
Carving detail at Saxman

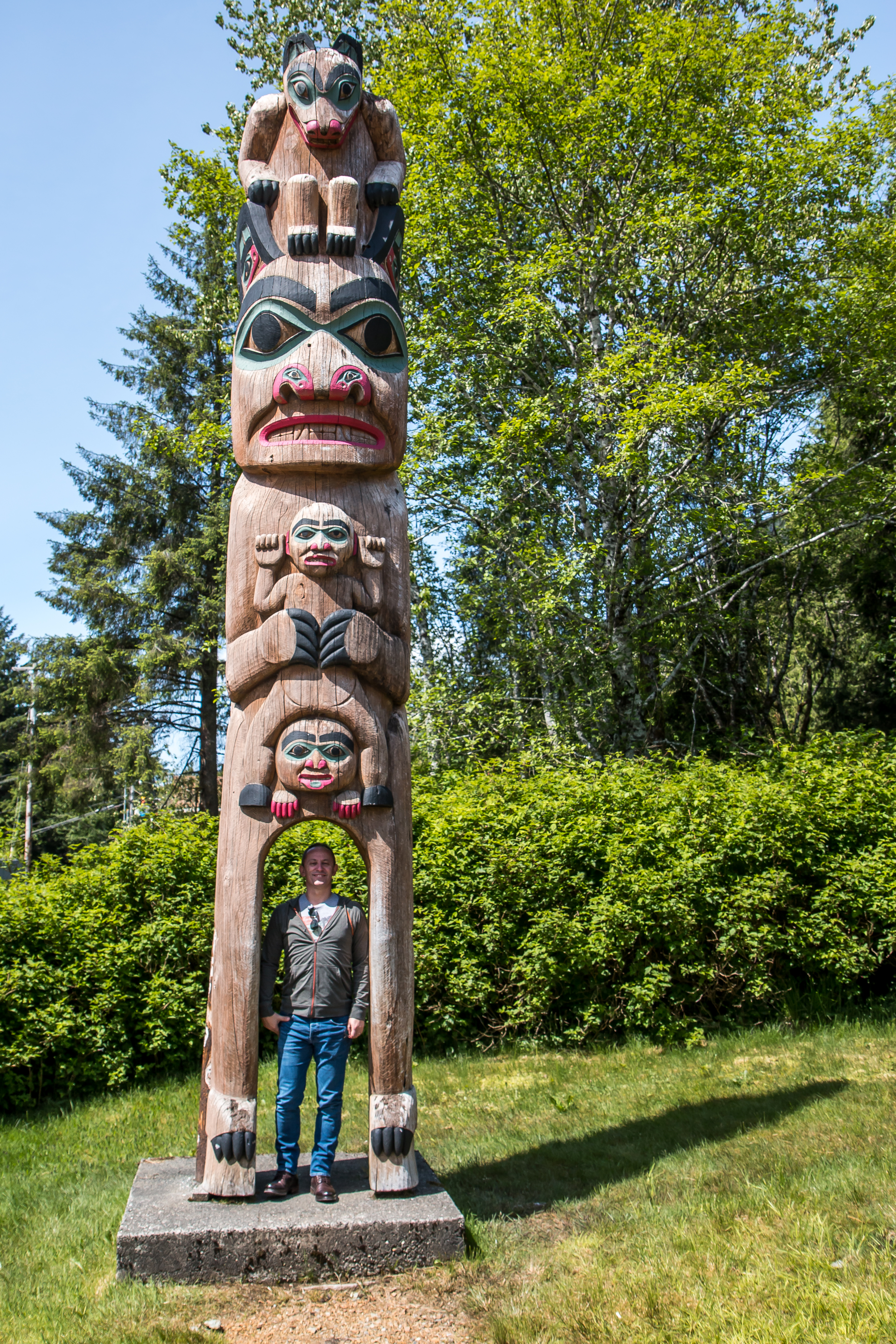
Totem pole and person, indicating scale

== List of totem poles, monuments and house posts ==
- Sun and Raven
- Raven and Frog
- Tired-Wolf House Posts
- The Beaver Posts
- The Blackfish Pole
- Klawak Blackfish Fin
- The Frog Tree
- Grizzly Bear Monument
- Kats and his Bear Wife
- The Lincoln Totem
- Secretary of State Pole
- Raven Pole
- The Grizzly Bear Post
- The Loon Tree
- Owl Memorial
- Pointing Figure
- Giant Rock Oyster Pole
- Memorials of Eagle Tail House
- Dogfish Totem

== See also ==
- Organized Village of Saxman, federally recognized Tlingit tribe
- Totem Heritage Center in Ketchikan, which also has a collection of historic totem poles
- National Register of Historic Places listings in Ketchikan Gateway Borough, Alaska
