= Crescent Glacier (Alaska) =

Glacier in Alaska, United States

- Location within Alaska
- Interactive map of Crescent Glacier
- Type: glacier
- Location: College Fjord, Alaska, U.S.
- Coordinates: 60°59′38″N 147°51′31″W
- Length: 5.5 miles (8.9 km)
- Terminus: 538 ft (164 m)

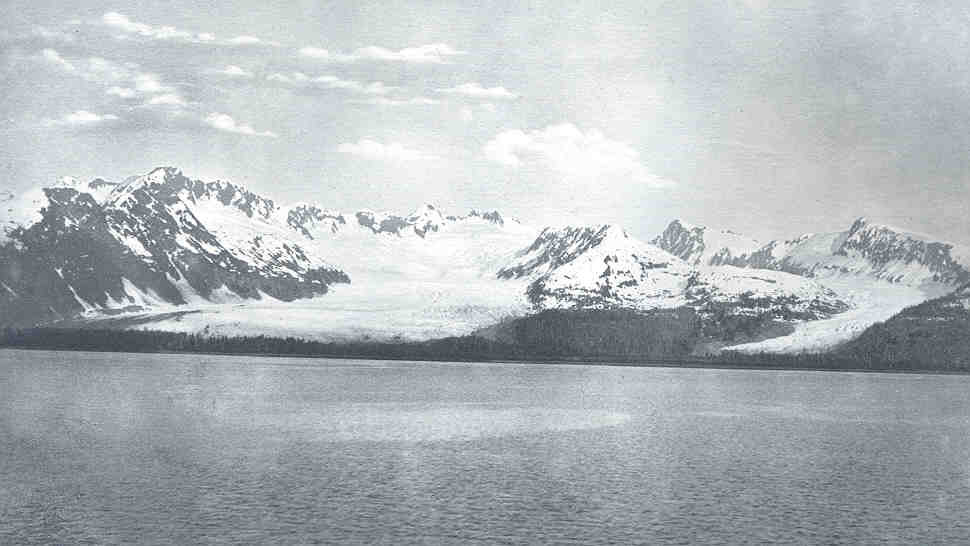
Crescent Glacier

Crescent Glacier is a 5.5-mile-long (8.9 km) glacier in the U.S. state of Alaska. It trends northwest on the east bank of College Fjord, 55 miles (89 km) west of Valdez. It was named by members of the 1899 Harriman Alaska Expedition.

== See also ==
- List of glaciers
