= Hawkins Glacier =

Glacier in the United States

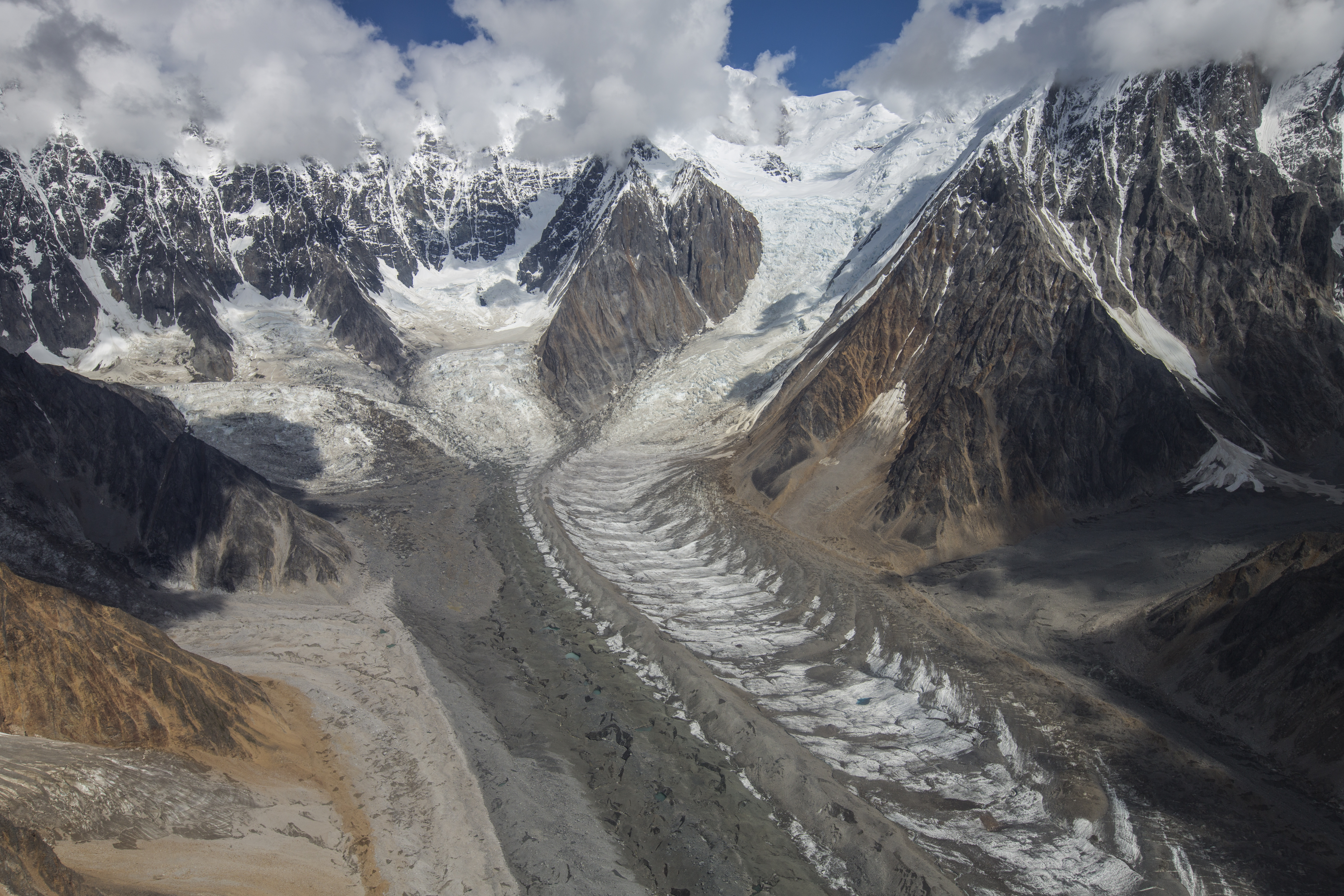
- The head of Hawkins Glacier

- Location within Alaska
- Interactive map of Hawkins Glacier
- Location: Alaska, U.S.
- Coordinates: 61°13′59″N 141°53′37″W
- Length: 35 km (22 mi)
- Status: Retreating

Hawkins Glacier is a 35 km (22 mi) long glacier in the U.S. state of Alaska. It trends southwest from Mount Bona to its terminus at the Chitina River west of Barnard Glacier, 37 miles (60 km) southeast of McCarthy.

== See also ==
- List of glaciers
