= Downer (surname) =

Downer is an English and Irish surname. Notable people with the surname include:

- Alec Downer (1910–1981), Australian politician and diplomat
- Alexander Downer (born 1951), Australian politician
- Alfred Wallace Downer (1904–1994), Canadian politician
- Billy Downer (born 1956), South African deputy director
- George Downer (1839–1916), Australian lawyer and businessman
- Hunt Downer (born 1946), American politician
- John Downer (1843–1915), Australian Premier and lawyer
- Naleya Downer (born 1980), Jamaican sprinter
- Sidney Downer (1909–1969), Australian journalist and sports writer
- Wally Downer (1904–1994), Canadian politician
- Downer family some members of the notable South Australian family
