= Organized Village of Saxman =

Alaska Native tribe

Organized Village of Saxman Saanyaa Ḵwáan (Tlingit)
- Alaska Native village
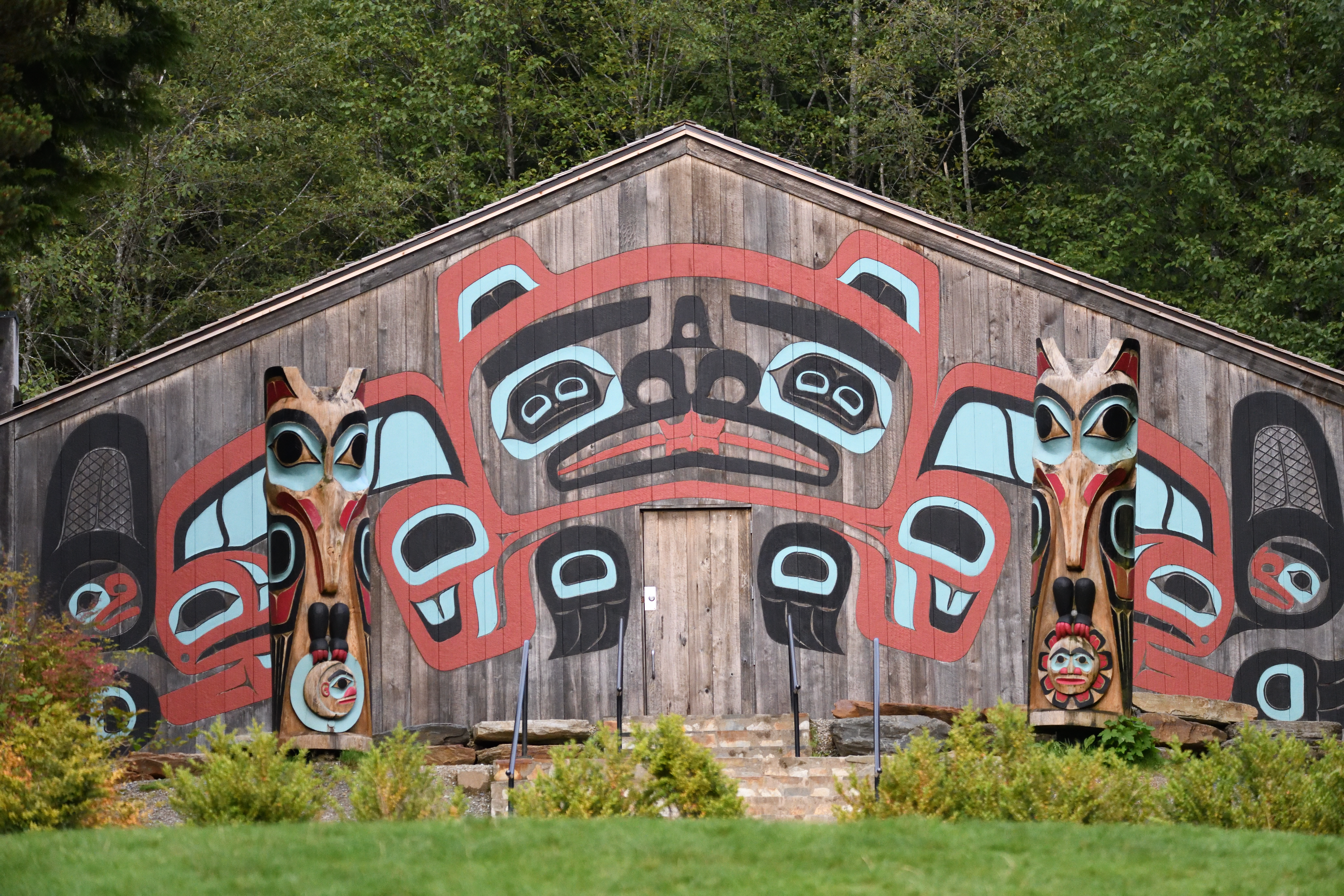
- Clan House at Saxman

- Organized Village of Saxman
- Coordinates: 55°19′07″N 131°35′51″W
- Constitution Ratified: January 14, 1941; 85 years ago
- Capital: Saxman, Alaska

Government
  - Type: Representative democracy
  - Body: Saxman Tribal Council
  - President: Joseph Williams Jr.

Population
  - Estimate: 386
- Demonym: Tlingit of Saxman
- Time zone: UTC–09:00 (AKST)
  - Summer (DST): UTC–08:00 (AKDT)
- Website: saxmantribe.org

The Organized Village of Saxman is a federally recognized Native American tribe of Tlingit people. This Alaska Native tribe is headquartered in Saxman, Alaska, and has 386 enrolled citizens.

They are known as the Tlingit of Saxman and Tlingit: Saanyaa Ḵwáan, which translates as the "People of the Southeast Wind".

== Government ==
The Organized Village of Saxman is led by a democratically elected tribal council. Its president is Joseph Williams Jr. The Alaska Regional Office of the Bureau of Indian Affairs serves the tribe.

The tribe ratified its constitution and corporate charter in 1941.

== Territory ==
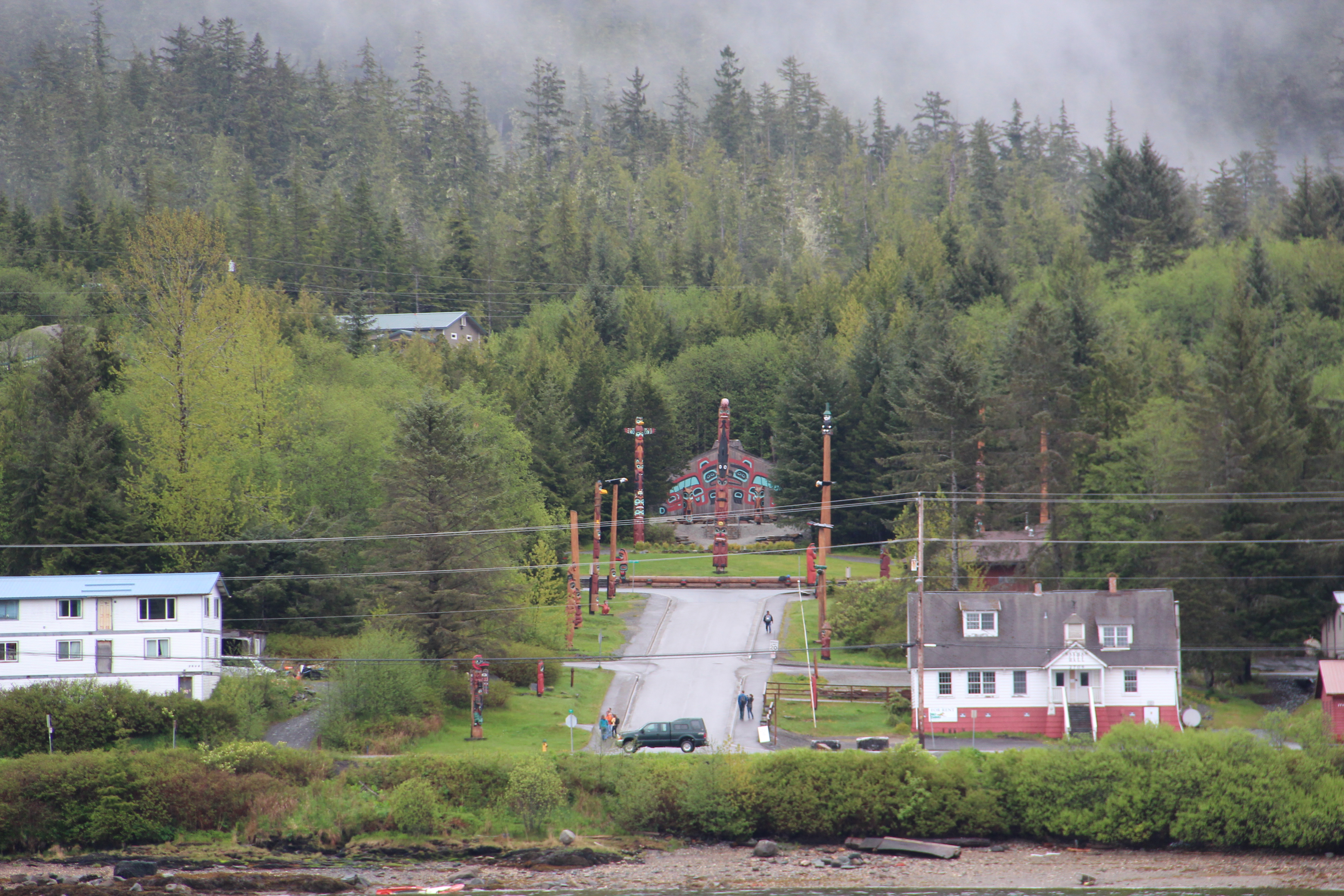
View of Saxman from a boat

Historically, a Tlingit community lived in Cape Fox Village, on the Alexander Archipelago. The Cape Fox Tlingit and some of the Tongass Tlingit moved from Cape Fox Village to Saxman (Tlingit: T’èesh Ḵwáan Xagu), which is two miles south of Ketchikan on Revillagigedo Island.

Saxman is connected to Ketchikan by the South Tongass Highway. Travel off the island is airplane or boat.

The Saxman Totem Park is a significant site for historical totem poles moved from unoccupied villages or carved more by Tlingit artists hired by the Civilian Conservation Corps from 1938 to 1941. Charles Brown (Tlingit) was the lead carver. The park was placed on the National Register of Historic Places in 1979.

The Saxman Community Center is an important hub for Alaska Native arts. In 2010, Nathan Jackson (Tlingit) carved and painted a bear screen from cedar, and in 2011, local children painted a mural, both on display in the community center, along with a cedar canoe and historical photographs.

== Economy ==
Cultural tourism and traditional arts are importance to the village's economy.

The Organized Village of Saxman is affiliated with Sealaska Corporation, an Alaska Native corporation, and the Cape Fox Corporation, an ANCSA Village Corporation.

== Climate change ==
Alaska Natives are already feeling the effects of climate change from increased fires, harsher storms, melting permafrost, erosion along the coasts, and weather patterns shifting. To address these threats, in 2006, 162 Alaska Native tribes, including the Organized Village of Saxman, and corporations working with the Native American Rights Fund, signed a Climate Change resolution calling upon Congress to pass laws to reduce greenhouse gas emissions.

== Language and culture ==
The Organized Village of Saxman speaks English and the Tlingit language.

== See also ==
- Culture of the Tlingit
- History of the Tlingit
