= Glacier head =

Top of a glacier

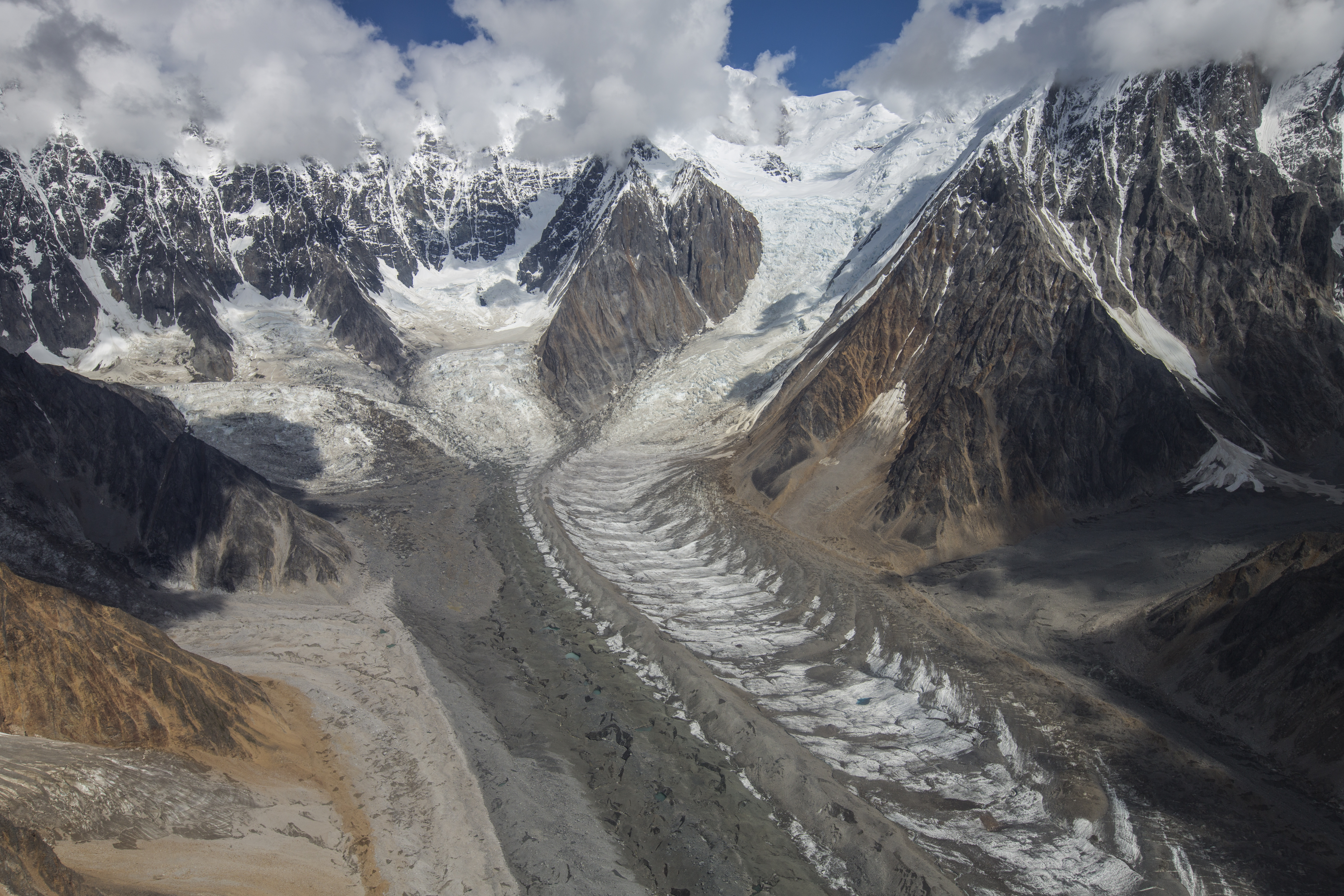
The head of Hawkins Glacier, Alaska

A glacier head is the top of a glacier. Although glaciers seem motionless to the observer they are in constant motion and the terminus is always either advancing or retreating.

The accumulation zone is found at the highest altitude of the glacier, where accumulation of material is greater than ablation.

On a glacier, the accumulation zone is the area above the firn line, where snowfall accumulates and exceeds the losses from ablation, (melting, evaporation, and sublimation). The annual equilibrium line separates the accumulation and ablation zone annually. The accumulation zone is also defined as the part of a glacier's surface, usually at higher elevations, on which there is net accumulation of snow, which subsequently turns into firn and then glacier ice. Part of the glacier where snow builds up and turns to ice moves outward from there.

The glacier head is the highest upslope edge of an alpine glacier or the upslope end of the zone of accumulation. The head of the glacier comes up against a steep bedrock cliff called a cirque headwall

Cross section of a cirque glacier showing the bergschrund

== Movement and ice loss ==
The head can come away from the cirque in a downslope movement which can create a large crevasse called a bergschrund. This crevasse can be a major obstacle for mountaineers. The existence of a bergschrund is evidence that ice mass has pulled away from the cirque.

A shrinking glacier thins faster near the terminus than near the head, which explains why glaciers retreat up-valley and the glacier head stays in place

The speed of erosion or accumulation is partly dependent on a shape factor which is the ratio of the change in thickness at the glacier head to the change in the thickness at the terminus.

== Notes ==
attribution:Contains text copied from Accumulation zone and Bergschrund and Terminus.
