= Saxman, Alaska =

City in Alaska, United States

Saxman, Alaska T’èesh Ḵwáan Xagu
- City
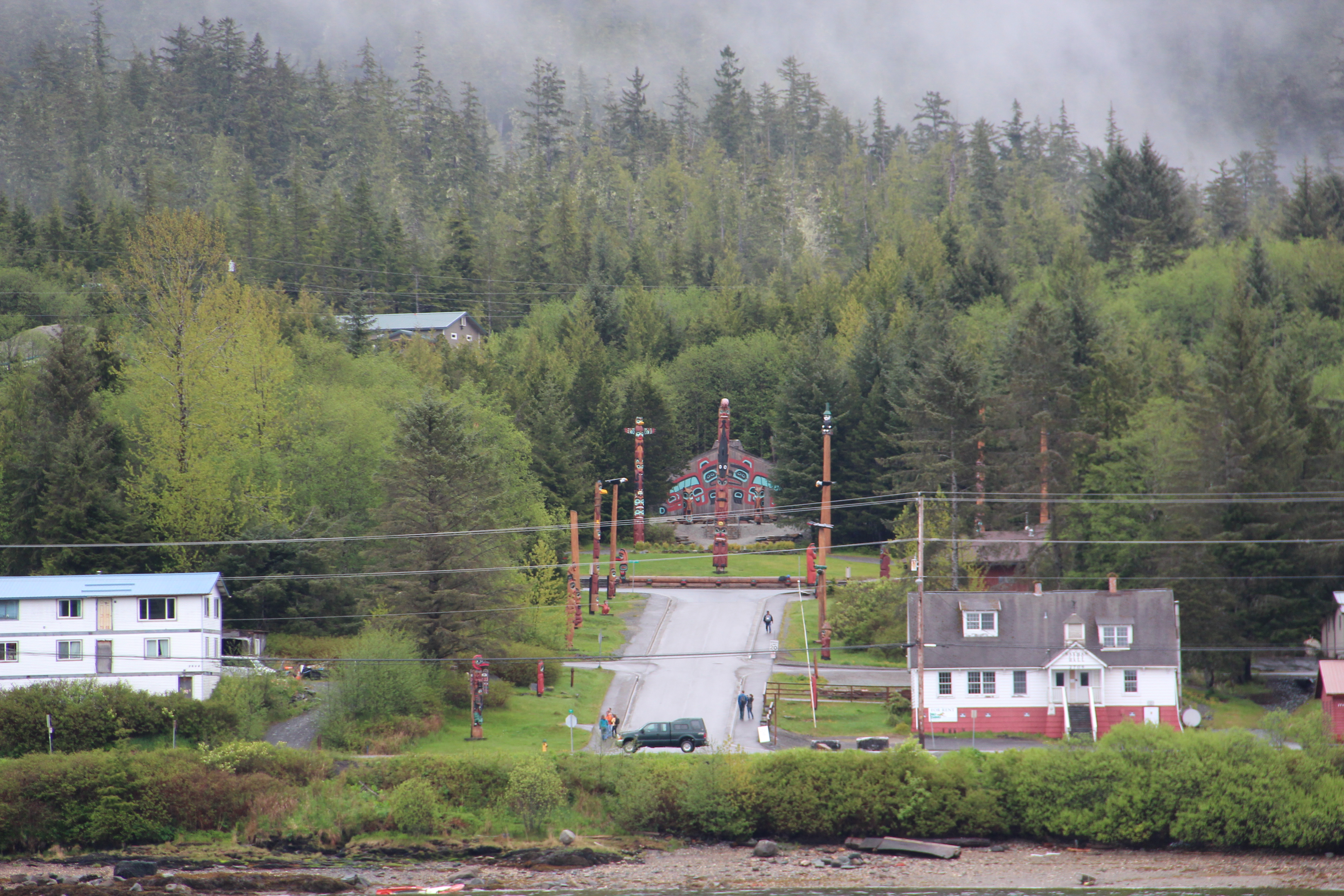
- Saxman Totem Park

- Seal

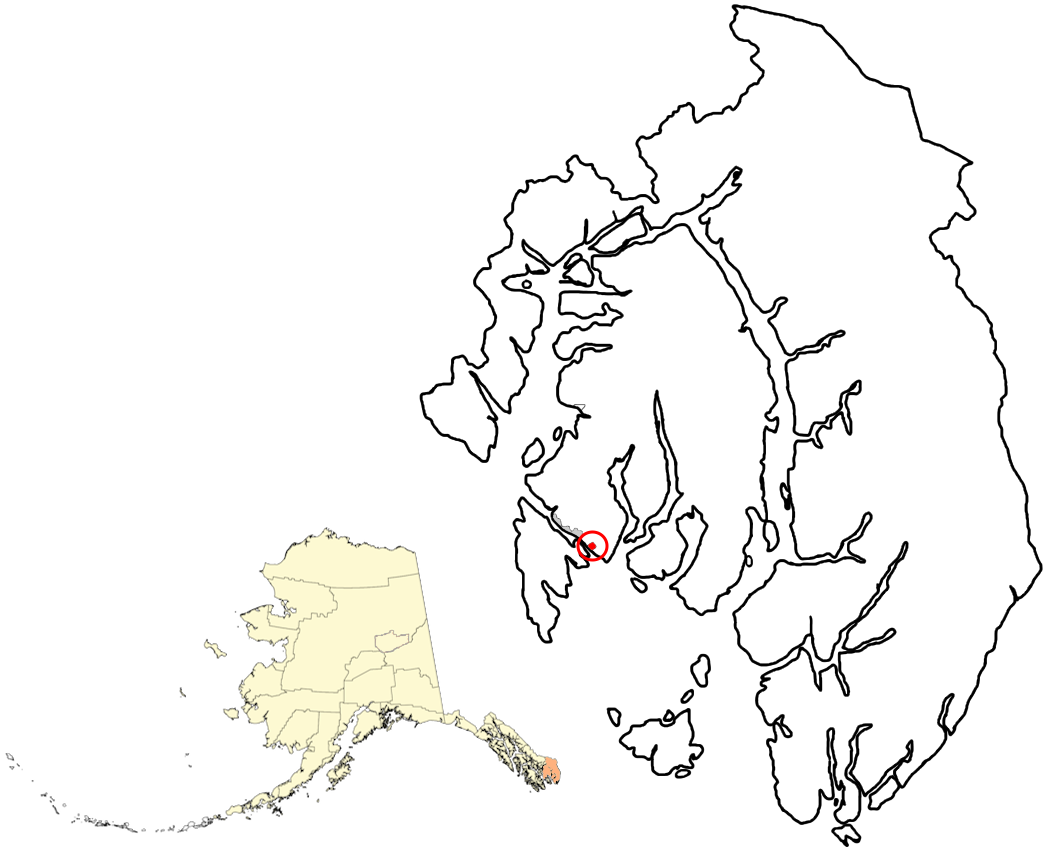
- Location in Ketchikan Gateway Borough, Alaska
- Coordinates: 55°19′14″N 131°35′54″W
- Country: United States
- State: Alaska
- Borough: Ketchikan Gateway
- Incorporated: January 22, 1930

Government
  - Mayor: Frank Seludo
  - State senator: Bert Stedman (R)
  - State rep.: Dan Ortiz (I)

Area
  - Total: 0.97 sq mi (2.50 km^{2})
  - Land: 0.97 sq mi (2.50 km^{2})
  - Water: 0 sq mi (0.00 km^{2})
- Elevation: 52 ft (16 m)

Population (2020)
  - Total: 384
  - Density: 398.2/sq mi (153.74/km^{2})
- Time zone: UTC-9 (Alaska (AKST))
  - Summer (DST): UTC-8 (AKDT)
- Zip code: 99901
- Area code: 907
- FIPS code: 02-67570
- GNIS feature ID: 1414511
- Website: www.saxman.gov

Saxman (Lingít: T’èesh Ḵwáan Xagu) is a town on Revillagigedo Island in Ketchikan Gateway Borough in southeastern Alaska, United States. As of the 2020 census, Saxman had a population of 384.

Saxman is the headquarters of the Organized Village of Saxman, a federally recognized tribe of Tlingit Native Americans.

The city of Ketchikan lies just to its northwest.

== Geography ==
Saxman is located at 55°19′14″N 131°35′54″W (55.320557, -131.598364).

According to the United States Census Bureau, the city has a total area of 0.97 square miles (2.5 km^{2}), all land.

== Demographics ==
Historical population
Census	Pop.	Note	%±
1900	142		—
1910	154		8.5%
1920	103		−33.1%
1930	112		8.7%
1940	111		−0.9%
1950	167		50.5%
1960	153		−8.4%
1970	135		−11.8%
1980	273		102.2%
1990	369		35.2%
2000	431		16.8%
2010	411		−4.6%
2020	384		−6.6%
U.S. Decennial Census

Saxman first appeared on the 1900 U.S. Census as an unincorporated village. It formally incorporated in 1930.

=== 2020 census ===
As of the 2020 census, Saxman had a population of 384. The median age was 39.7 years. 24.0% of residents were under the age of 18 and 17.4% of residents were 65 years of age or older. For every 100 females there were 114.5 males, and for every 100 females age 18 and over there were 119.5 males age 18 and over.

97.9% of residents lived in urban areas, while 2.1% lived in rural areas.

There were 128 households in Saxman, of which 32.0% had children under the age of 18 living in them. Of all households, 29.7% were married-couple households, 27.3% were households with a male householder and no spouse or partner present, and 33.6% were households with a female householder and no spouse or partner present. About 26.5% of all households were made up of individuals and 6.3% had someone living alone who was 65 years of age or older.

There were 152 housing units, of which 15.8% were vacant. The homeowner vacancy rate was 0.0% and the rental vacancy rate was 23.0%.

Racial composition as of the 2020 census
Race	Number	Percent
White	57	14.8%
Black or African American	2	0.5%
American Indian and Alaska Native	262	68.2%
Asian	2	0.5%
Native Hawaiian and Other Pacific Islander	0	0.0%
Some other race	4	1.0%
Two or more races	57	14.8%
Hispanic or Latino (of any race)	10	2.6%

=== 2000 census ===
As of the census of 2000, there were 431 people, 127 households, and 90 families residing in the city. The population density was 431.5 inhabitants per square mile (166.6/km^{2}). There were 146 housing units at an average density of 146.2 per square mile (56.4/km^{2}). The racial makeup of the city was 28.07% White, 0.46% Black or African American, 66.13% Native American, 0.46% Asian, 0.23% Pacific Islander, and 4.64% from two or more races. 2.32% of the population were Hispanic or Latino of any race.

There were 127 households, out of which 35.4% had children under the age of 18 living with them, 44.1% were married couples living together, 21.3% had a female householder with no husband present, and 29.1% were non-families. 20.5% of all households were made up of individuals, and 6.3% had someone living alone who was 65 years of age or older. The average household size was 3.13 and the average family size was 3.57.

In the city, the age distribution of the population shows 27.4% under the age of 18, 15.8% from 18 to 24, 26.2% from 25 to 44, 23.2% from 45 to 64, and 7.4% who were 65 years of age or older. The median age was 32 years. For every 100 females, there were 130.5 males. For every 100 females age 18 and over, there were 133.6 males.

The median income for a household in the city was $44,375, and the median income for a family was $45,417. Males had a median income of $35,139 versus $37,500 for females. The per capita income for the city was $15,642. About 7.4% of families and 12.1% of the population were below the poverty line, including 20.4% of those under age 18 and 6.3% of those age 65 or over.

== Arts ==
Saxman is one of the totem capitals of Alaska. Many historical totem poles are installed at the Saxman Totem Park.

== Notable residents ==
- Bill K. Williams (Tlingit), mayor of Saxman (1976–1983)
