= Downer Glacier =

Glacier in Alaska, United States

- Location within Alaska
- Interactive map of Downer Glacier
- Type: glacier
- Location: Kora Keen Range, Alaska, U.S.
- Coordinates: 61°16′26″N 147°36′47″W
- Length: 4.5 miles (7.2 km)
- Terminus: 3,461 ft (1,055 m)

Downer Glacier is a 2.6-mile-long (4.2 km) glacier in the U.S. state of Alaska. Trends west with a length of 2.6 mi (4.2 km), in Kora Keen Range, 46 mi (74 km) northwest of Valdez. It was named in 1910 by Lawrence Martin for the Milwaukee-Downer College for Women in Milwaukee, Wisconsin.

== See also ==
- List of glaciers
