= Barnard Glacier =

Glacier in Alaska, United States

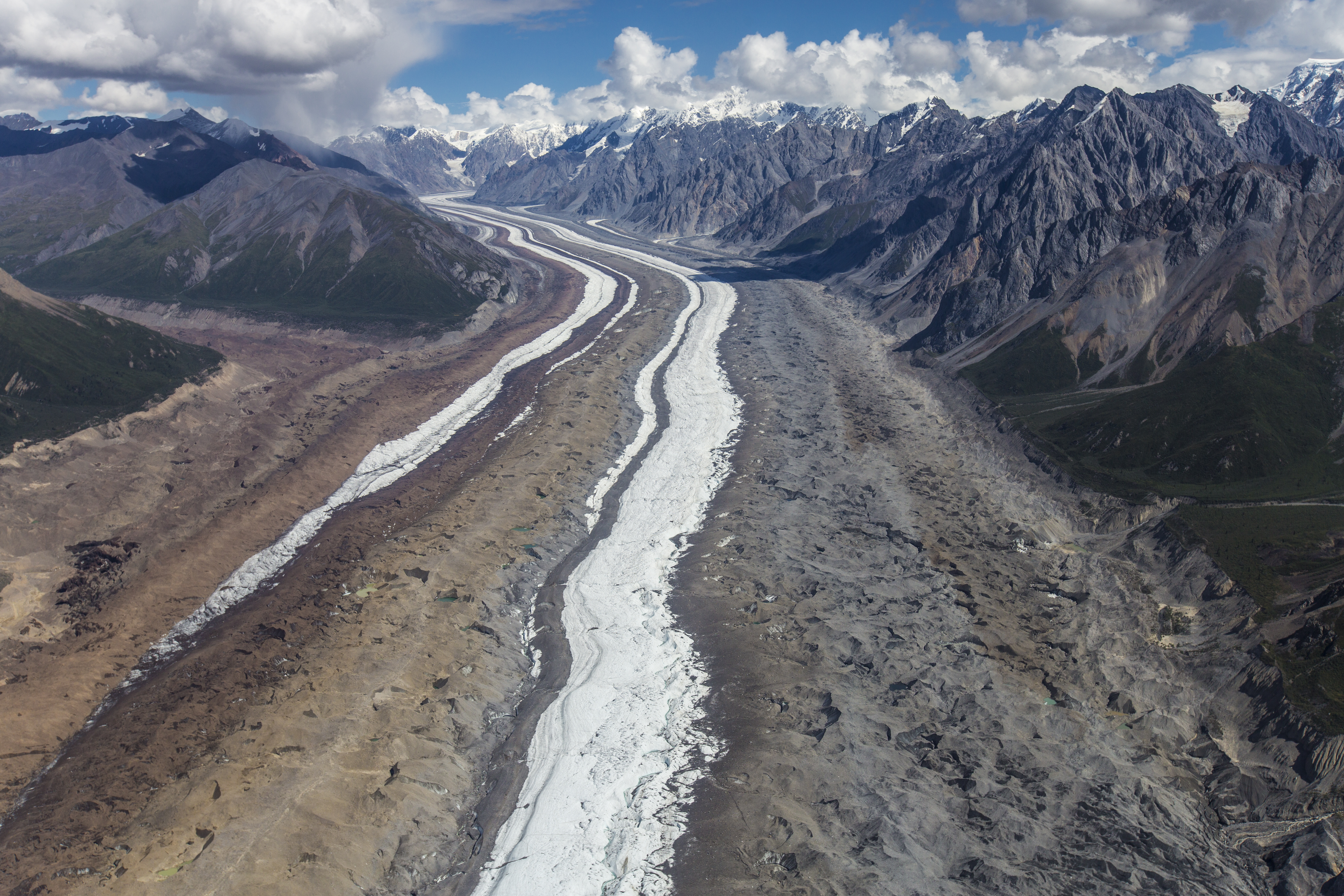

- Location within Alaska
- Interactive map of Barnard Glacier
- Location: Alaska, U.S.
- Coordinates: 61°09′54″N 141°34′00″W
- Length: 53 km (33 mi)
- Status: Retreating

Barnard Glacier is a 53 km (33 mi) long glacier in the U.S. state of Alaska. It trends southwest to the Chitina River east of Hawkins Glacier, 64 km (40 mi) southeast of McCarthy in the Saint Elias Mountains. The glacier is named for Barnard College, a member of the Seven Sisters that is associated with Columbia University in New York, New York.

== Geography ==
Barnard Glacier is a clean, crevassed ice tongue, with no medial or lateral moraines. It heads in a large cirque and connects with an irregular ice mass on a shelf to the nor glacier which has small terminal lobes and terminates on the lip of its hanging valley. Two streams descend from the terminus. Mature spruce forest extending from the fiord well up toward the glacier terminus indicates that Barnard Glacier has not descended much farther toward the fiord for a century or more; but a barren zone between the ice and forest, present in 1899 as well as in 1910, proves that it was retreating. Between 1899 and 1910 there was an advance of the south lobe down the lip of the hanging valley, and a slight advance of the north lobe, while between the two lobes an ice block talus was formed.

== See also ==
- List of glaciers
